= List of Norwegian photographers =

This is a list of Norwegian photographers

- Rolf Aamot (1934–)
- Jonas Bendiksen (1977–)
- Inga Breder (1855–1933)
- Knut Bry (1946–)
- Catherine Cameron (1962–)
- Mimi Frellsen (1830–1914)
- Kåre Kivijärvi (1938–1991)
- Luca Kleve-Ruud (1978–)
- Knud Knudsen (1832–1915)
- Elisabeth Meyer (1899–1968)
- Gunnar Høst Sjøwall (1936–2013)
- Rasmus Pedersen Thu (1864–1946)
- Anders Beer Wilse (1865–1949)
- Severin Worm-Petersen (1857–1933)

== See also ==
- Photography in Norway
