= Döberitzer Heide =

Coordinates: 52°29′53.69885″N 13°2′44.080811″E

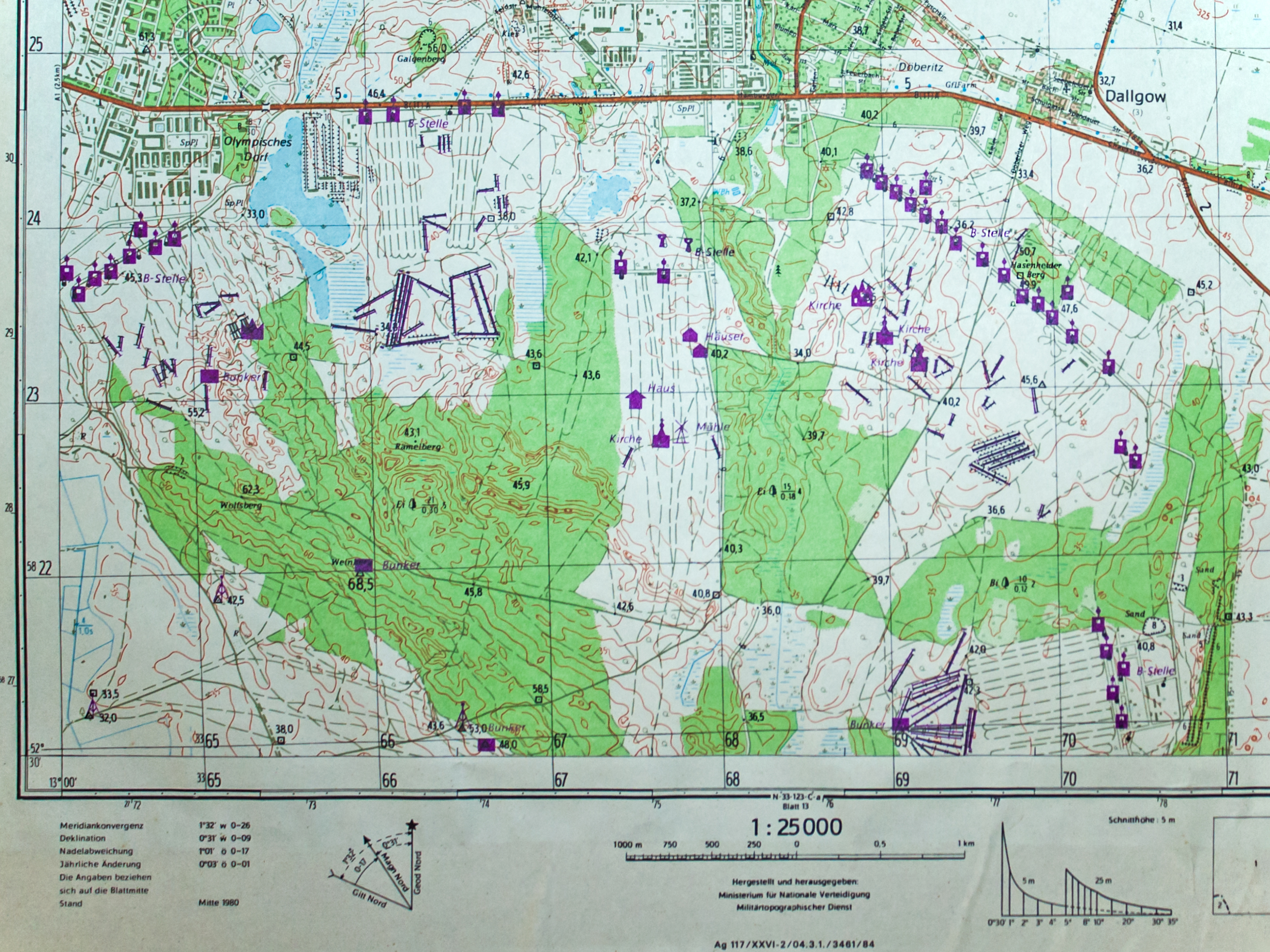
Military topographic map from 1980 during use by the Red Army

The Döberitzer Heide is an approximately 5000-hectare area in the Havelland region, part of the southeastern Nauen Plateau. The area mainly consists of the former Döberitz military training area, which has been designated as nature reserves and hosts a wilderness project by The Heinz Sielmann Foundation covering about 3600 hectares, unique in Europe. The heathland is located west of the Berlin city border and south of the Bundesstraße 5 between Dallgow-Döberitz and the district of Seeburg as well as the Wustermark districts of Elstal and Priort. A small part in the southwest lies within Potsdam territory.

== Military Use ==
Military use of the area began in 1713 with the first troop exercises under Friedrich Wilhelm I. In 1753, Frederick II conducted a large maneuver with about 44,000 soldiers. The official establishment of the Döberitz military training area began in 1892 under Emperor Wilhelm II. Between 1903 and 1911, the Heerstraße was built as a connection between the training area and the Berlin Palace on the Spree Island. In 1910, the associated Döberitz airfield was opened. In 1936, the Döberitzer Heide was used for military competitions during the 1936 Summer Olympics.

Until 1991, the area was heavily used by the Red Army, which left a significant mark on the landscape. After the withdrawal of Soviet troops, the Bundeswehr took over an area of about 550 hectares in the southern part of the Döberitzer Heide as a military training area for units stationed in Berlin and Potsdam.

== Nature Reserve and Natural Landscape ==
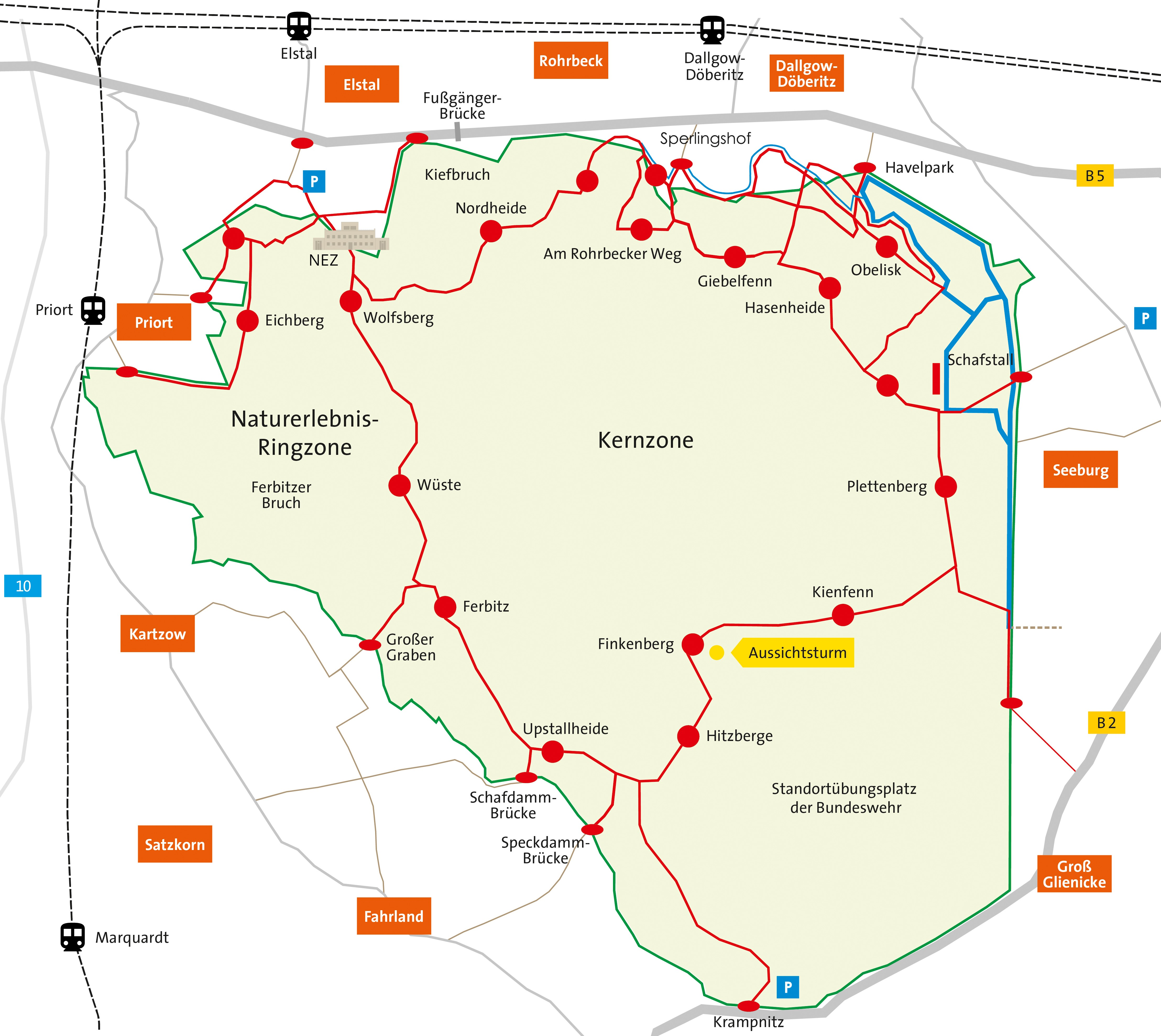
Map of the Döberitzer Heide

The nature reserve ("Naturschutzgebiet" or NSG) Döberitzer Heide (approximately 3415 hectares), established in 1997, together with the NSG Ferbitzer Bruch (approximately 1155 hectares) designated in 1996, forms large parts of the approximately 3600-hectare "Sielmann's Natural Landscape Döberitzer Heide". The NSG Döberitzer Heide mainly consists of higher and drier areas, while the NSG Ferbitzer Bruch encompasses lower and wetter regions. The natural landscape comprises an inner "Kernzone" (core zone) and an outer "Naturerlebnis-Ringzone" (nature experience ring zone).

The area was used continuously for military purposes for over 95 years until 1991, which largely spared it from agricultural use. This resulted in a valuable open landscape with heath, sandbanks, and dry grasslands, providing habitats for many rare animal and plant species. However, due to the high ammunition contamination, the area initially remained a restricted zone. The Döberitzer Heide is designated according to the European Habitats Directive.

More than 5000 plant and animal species have been recorded in the Döberitzer Heide, including 847 species of ferns and flowering plants such as the critically endangered Anacamptis palustris, marsh gentian, and rosa caesia. Additionally, about 2000 beetle species and at least 236 wasp, 188 bee, 198 bird, and 48 mammal species have been identified. The Döberitzer Heide also provides habitat for rare species such as the white-tailed eagle and European otter. Populations of two prehistoric crustaceans, Branchipus schaefferi and Triops cancriformis, are also known.

In 2008, the construction of a nature adventure camp (certified education center) for children was planned. The construction costs were estimated at around €650,000. The children were to be offered various educational opportunities such as a "green classroom", animal observations in the showcase enclosure, and plant studies on-site. The opening was planned for 2009. So far, only the showcase enclosure to the west has been built, as planning is still ongoing. Since 2014, there has been a Karls Erlebnis-Dorf on the site.

=== Core Zone ===
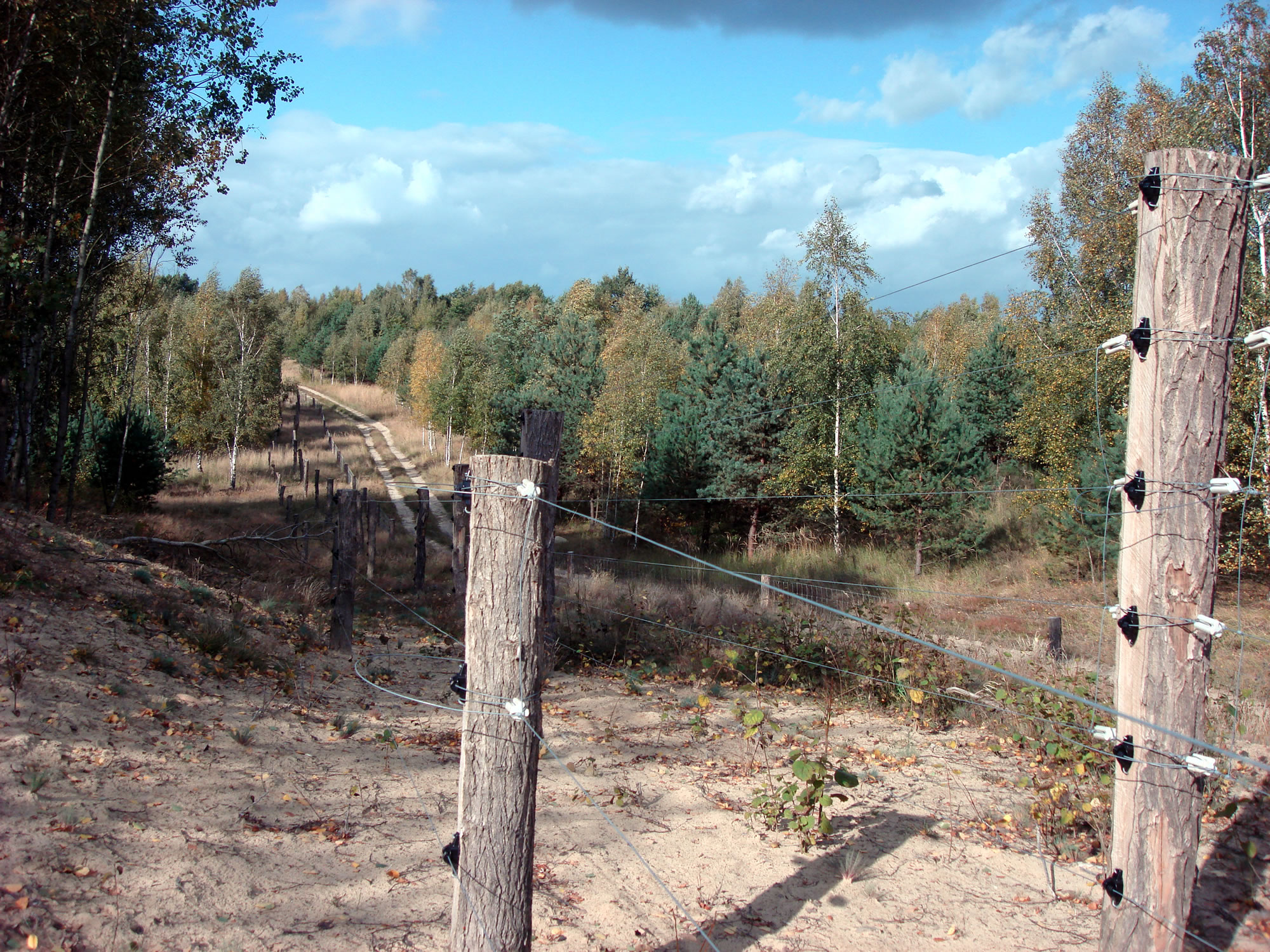
Electric fences of the core zone

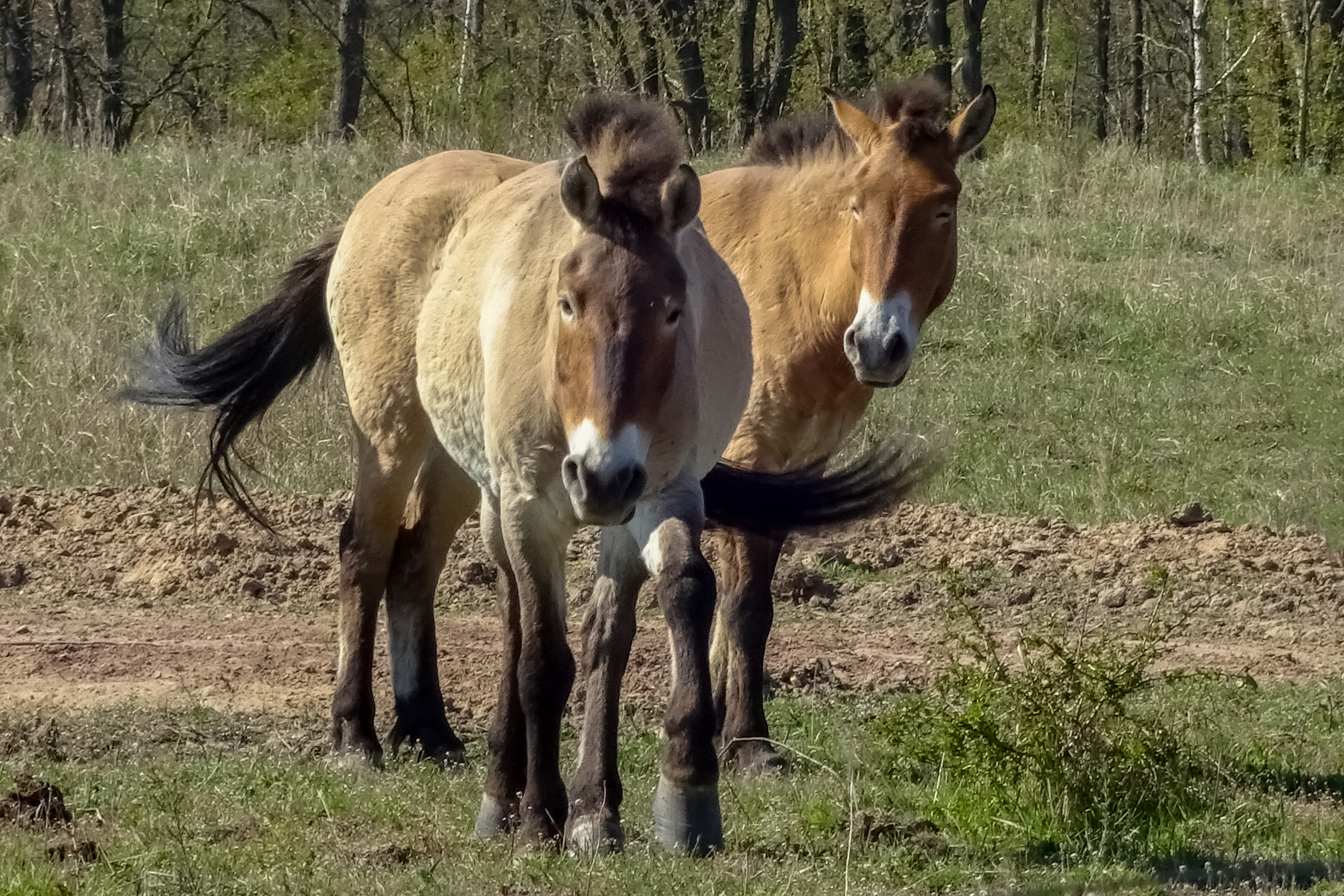
Przewalski horses in the core zone

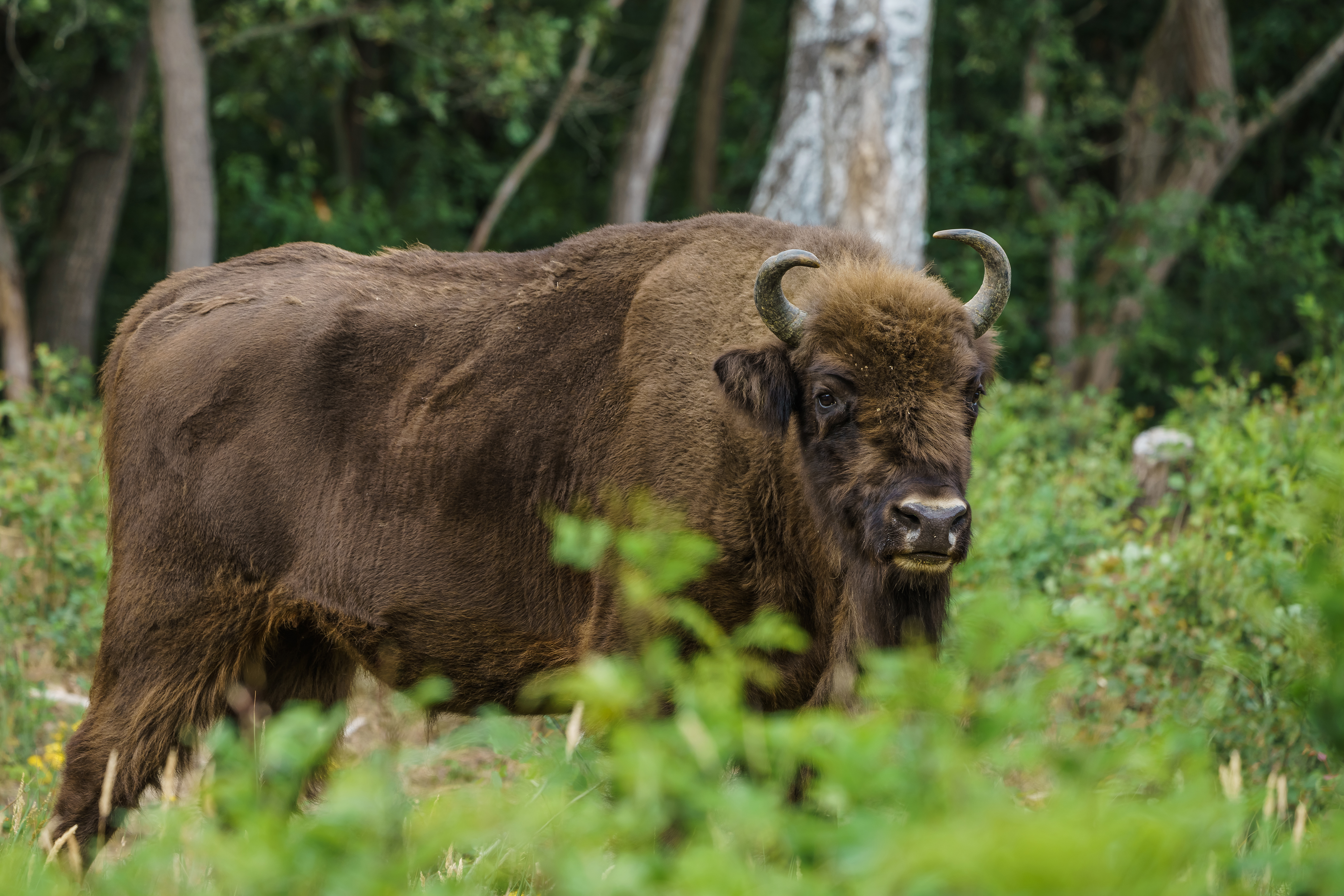
Wisent in the core zone

The core zone covers an area of 1860 hectares (including the acclimatization zone) and is surrounded by a triple fence (a wire mesh fence and two electric fences 1.5 meters and about 2 meters high) to protect the animals. In 2008, straight clearings 20-50 meters wide were cut through the Döberitzer Heide to mark the boundary of the core zone. This construction work, which involved heavy equipment, destroyed many old oaks, hill chains, and smaller biotopes that had previously been spared from military use.

The animals released in the core zone, such as red deer, wisents (European bison), and Przewalski's horses, are intended to live largely unaffected by humans. Their feeding habits are intended to protect the area from becoming overgrown and to preserve the open or semi-open landscape. In January 2008, the first Przewalski horses were released into the acclimatization zone, followed by the first wisents in March.

In May 2010, eleven wisents and seven Przewalski horses lived in the wilderness core zone. By mid-2015, there were about 14 horses, 58 wisents, and 60 red deer. They are entirely self-sufficient; they are neither fed nor vaccinated.

=== Nature Experience Ring Zone ===
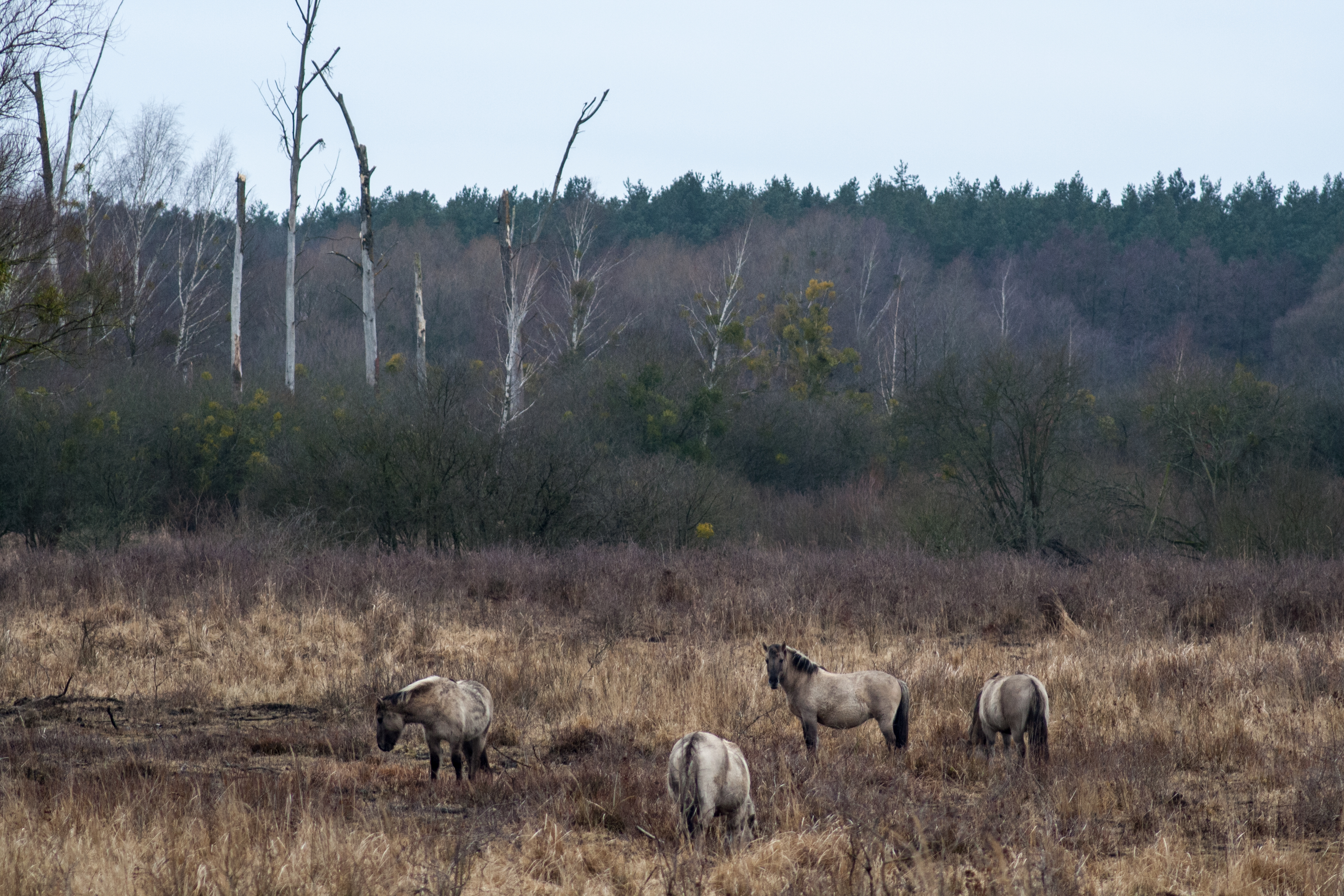
Konik horses

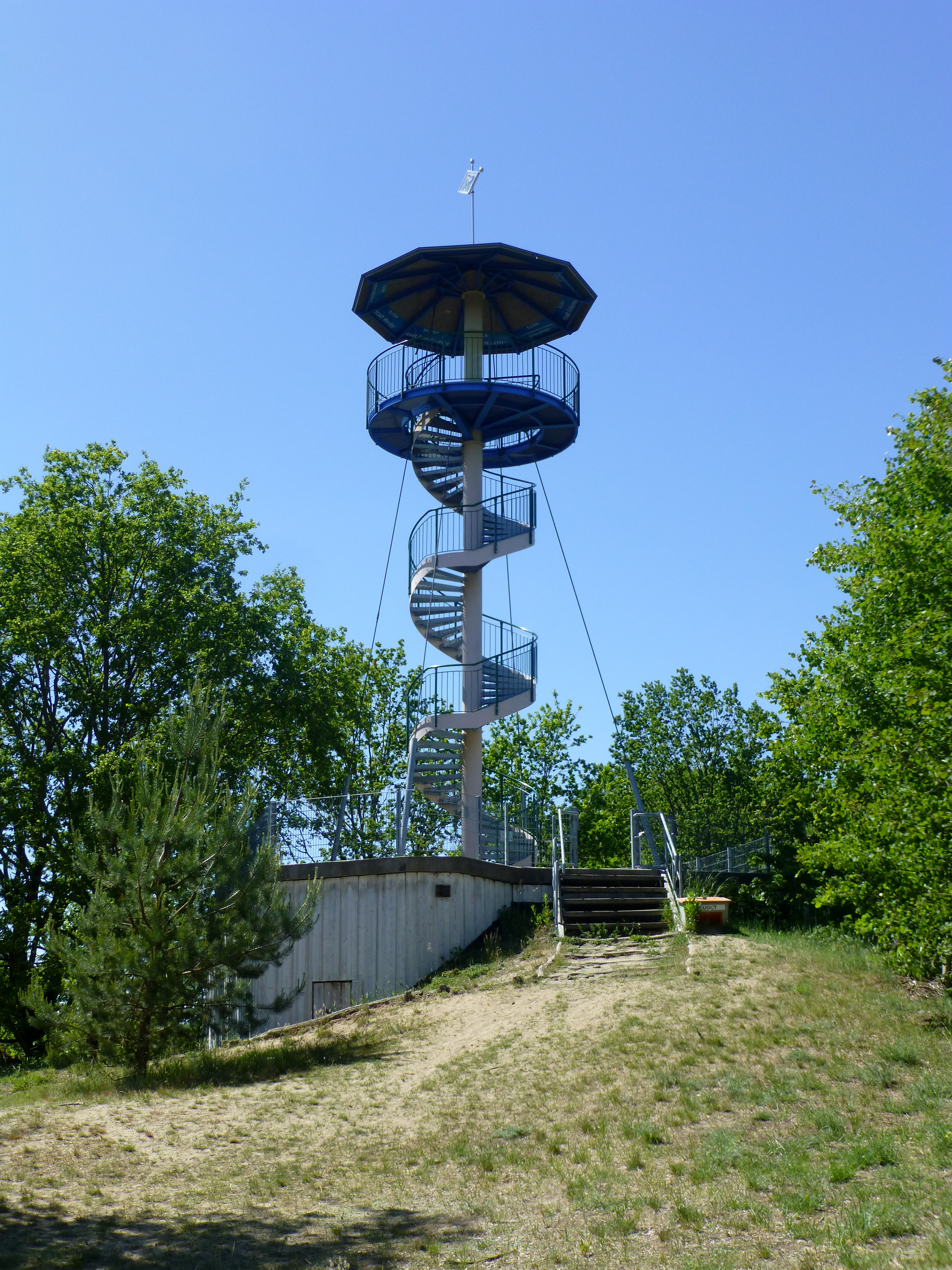
Observation tower on Finkenberg

The core zone is surrounded by the so-called Nature Experience Ring Zone ("Nerz" for short): This covers an area of about 1616 ha. Here, the maintenance and preservation of the diverse nature conservation areas are carried out through the use of agricultural livestock. The coordination and supervision of these grazing projects are carried out by local farmers and the Nature Conservation Support Association Döberitzer Heide.

The Nature Experience Ring Zone is accessible via various hiking trails, which have been supplemented with rest and observation points. Along the trails, Galloway cattle and Heck cattle, various breeds of sheep and goats, Sardinian donkeys, and Konik horses can be observed and experienced.

== Photo gallery ==
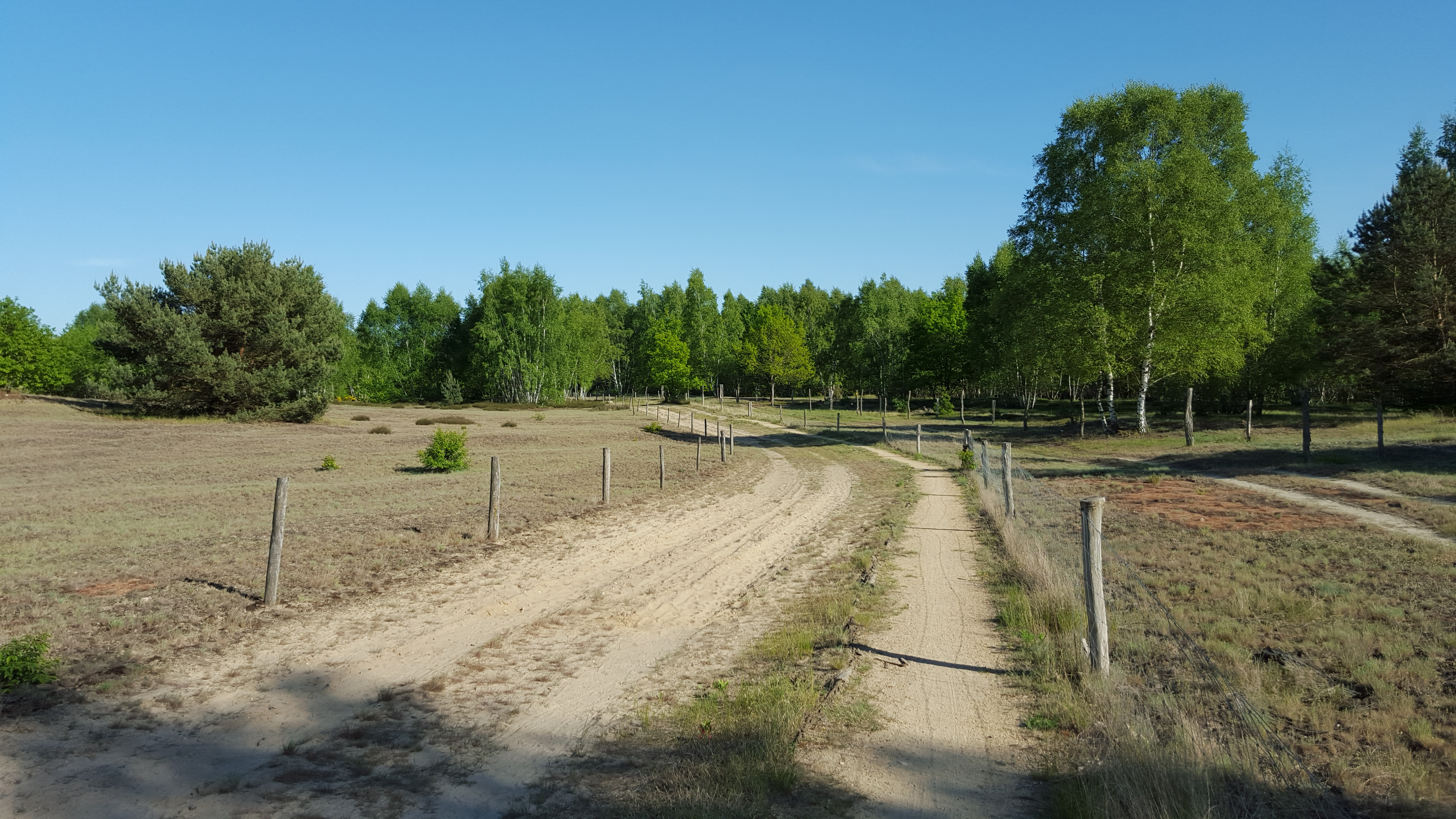
Landscape

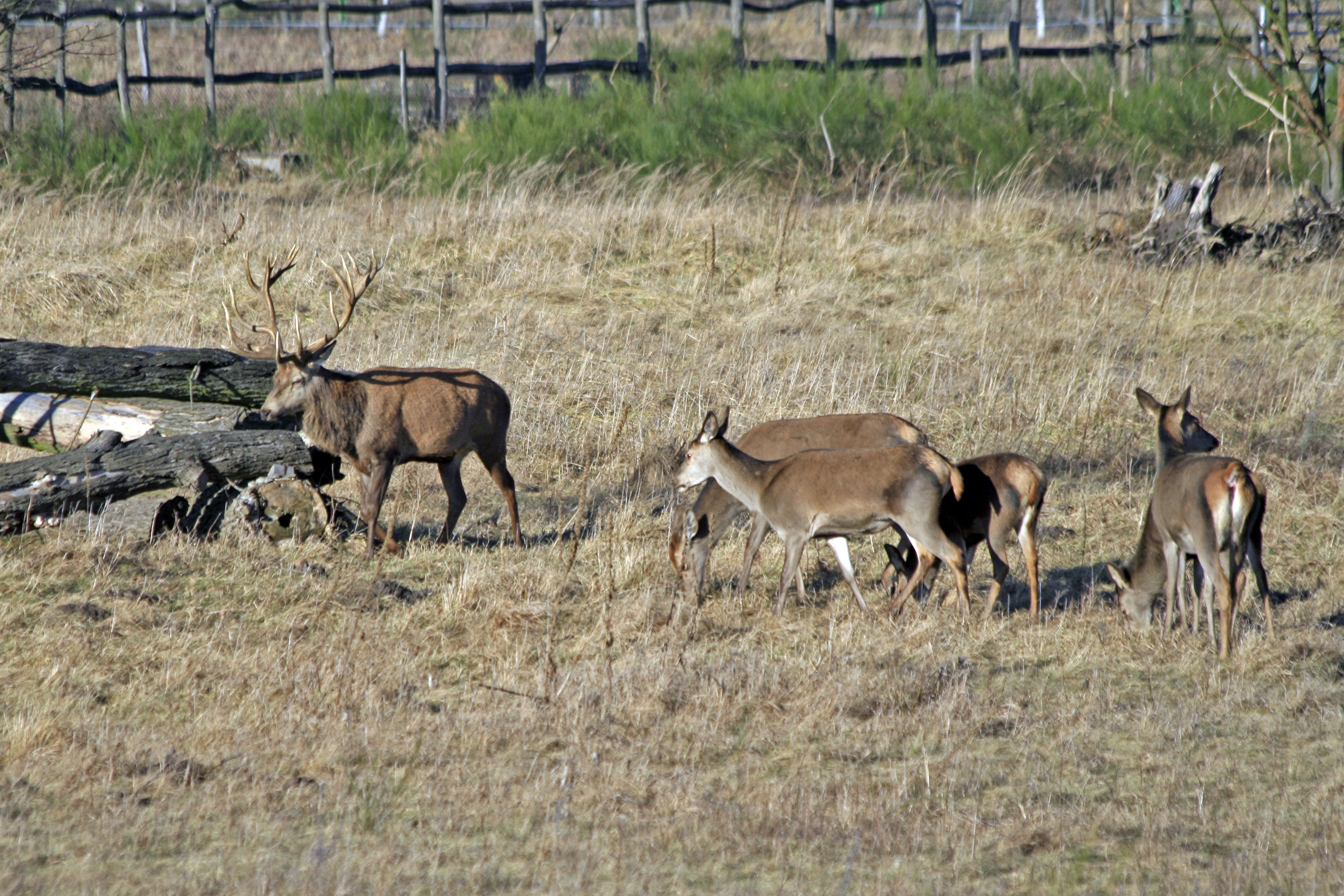
Red deer

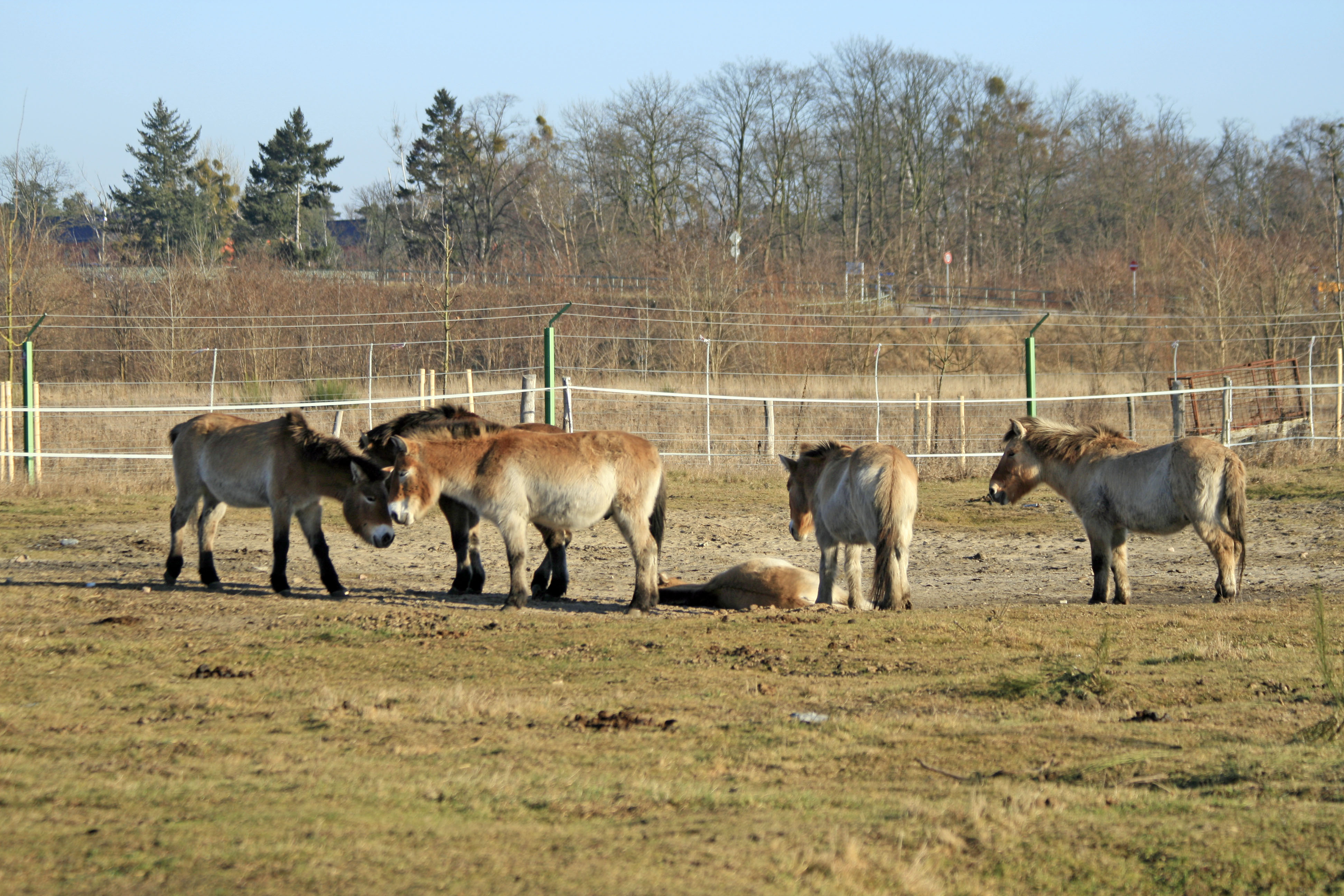
Przewalski's horse

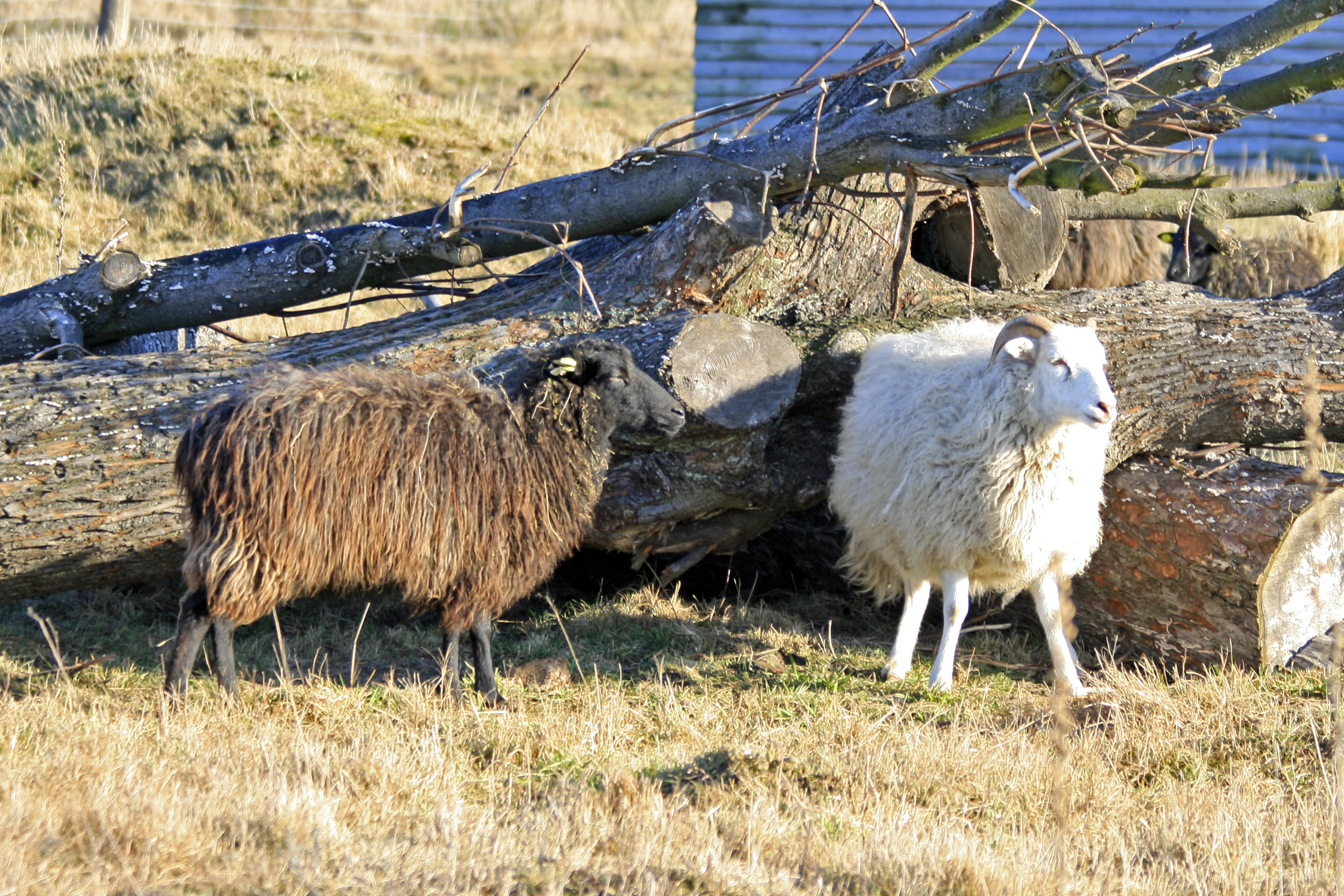
Skudde

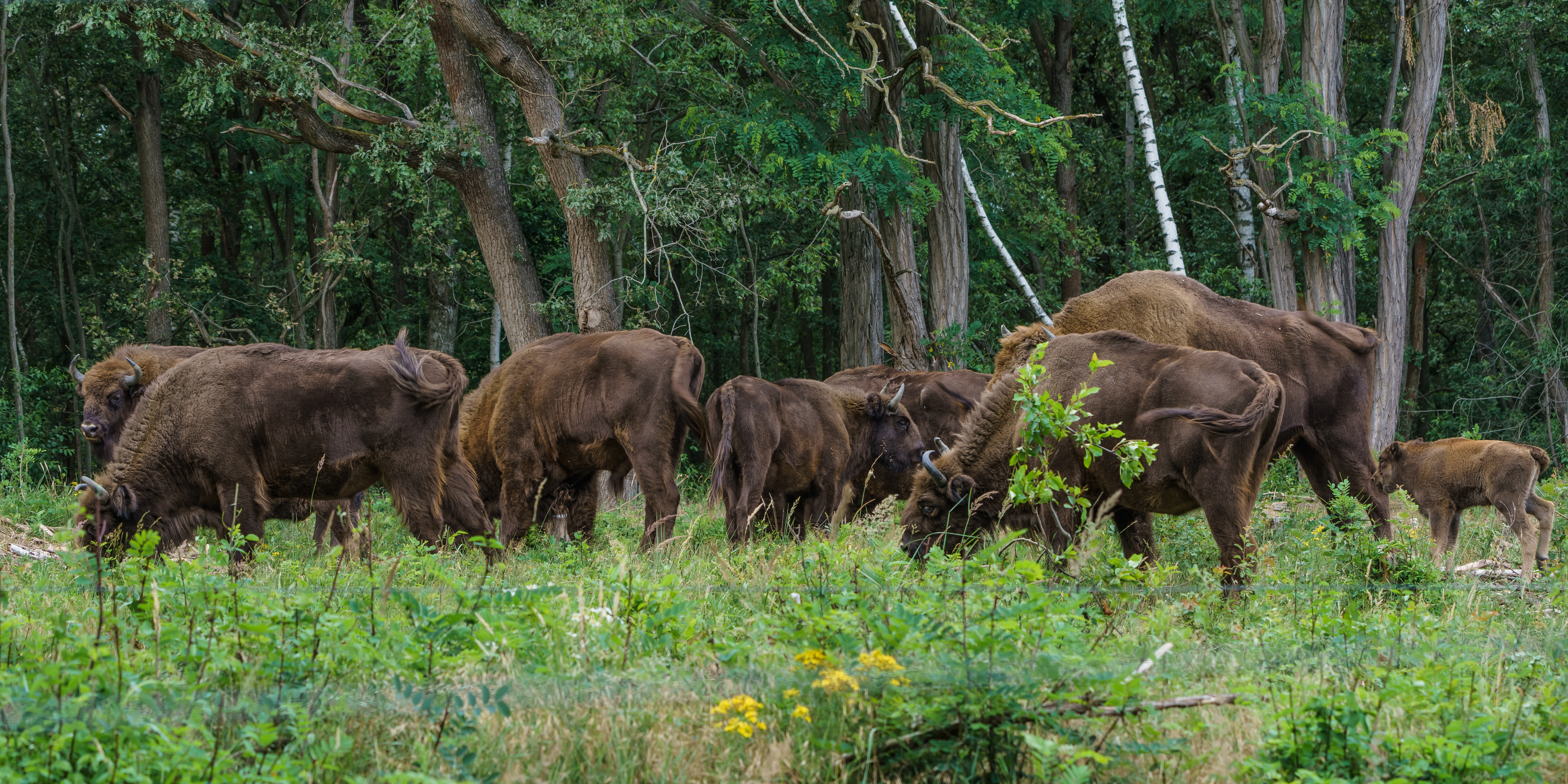
Wisent

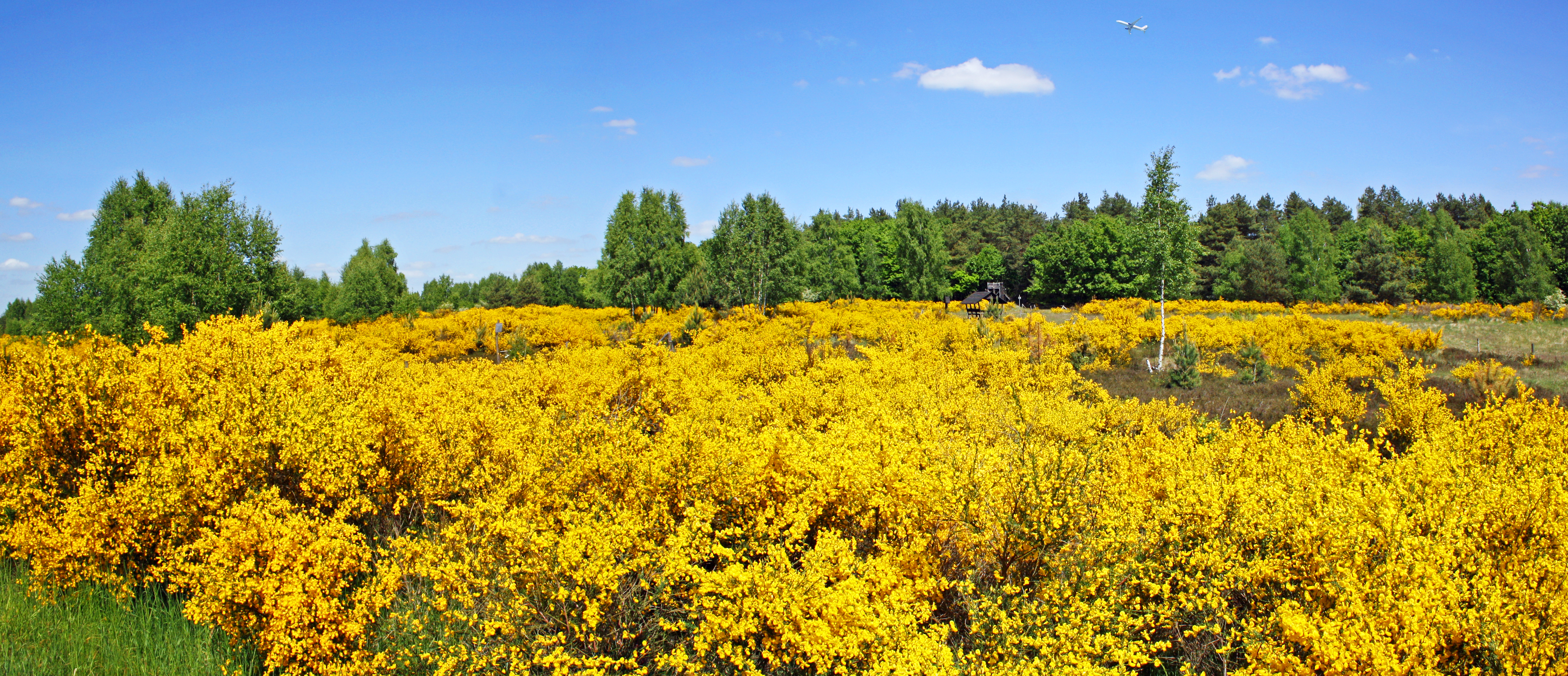
Landscape
