= Döberitz military training area =

Coordinates: 52°30′45.96″N 13°3′5.48″E

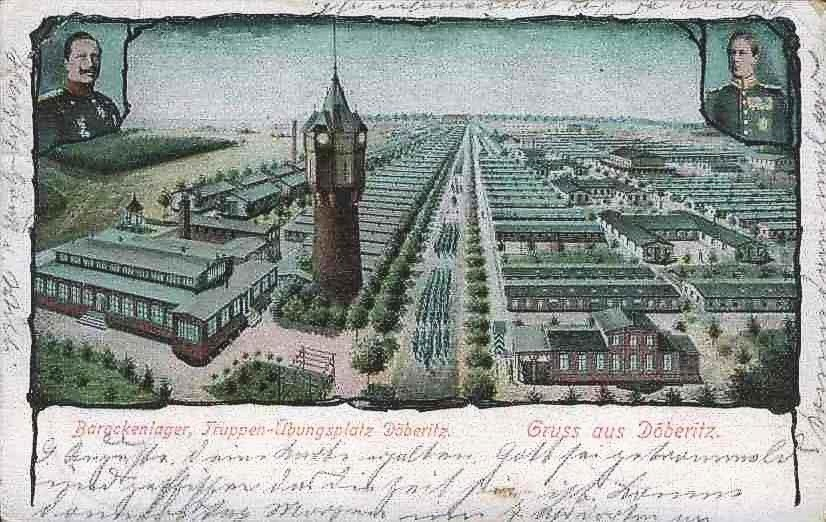
Training area in Döberitz, postcard from 1900

The Döberitz military training area (German: Truppenübungsplatz Döberitz or Heeresschule Döberitz), was a major military training area near Dallgow-Döberitz, in Brandenburg to the west of Berlin. Döberitz was one of the largest training areas in Germany. The area was used for more than 300 years. until 1992 by the Prussian Army, the Reichswehr and the Wehrmacht as well as the Soviet occupation forces. The area was used for troop training of the army, for non-commissioned officer and officer training, from 1910 also the training of pilots, for testing new aircraft, and in the 1930s as a training area for motor vehicles.

== History ==
The area of the Döberitzer Heide, which was still forested until 1896, was used as a military maneuver area for around 300 years until 1992. It became a training area in 1896. This was located west of Berlin in the Havelland between Dallgow in the north, Krampnitz in the south, Priort in the west, and Seeburg in the east. In this area, King Frederick I's regiments were occasionally trained in practical warfare. The first military use of the area around the village of Döberitz was recorded in 1713 under Frederick William I. In September 1753, under Frederick II, the first large maneuver followed, which was misleadingly depicted in literature during the Seven Years' War, with 44,000 soldiers already participating.

Until 1890, the Berlin and Potsdam troops conducted shooting exercises at the shooting range in Tegel. Due to the shortcomings of the place, the Prussian military leadership demanded a permanent training ground. The then Chief of the General Staff of the Guard Corps decided on the area around Döberitz. In 1892, the then General Staff Officer von Bredow was commissioned to inspect the area and determine the boundaries. The land surveys and the negotiations of the military treasury with the affected communities began in 1893, and by 1894, the military treasury requisitioned an area of about 4400 hectares around Döberitz.

After the purchase negotiations were completed, three-quarters of the forested area was cleared. Some of the resulting wood was used for the construction of the officers' mess, the barracks, and the stables of the Guard camp. This was done with regard to the expected troop deployment in colonies (e.g., the Boxer Rebellion in China) to simulate steppe and desert-like geographies. Since 1895, the permanent establishment was carried out by setting up and constructing a commandant's office and garrison administration. The original location of the commandant's office was in Spandau until 1910 and was only moved to Döberitz during the summer months – during the time of the exercises.

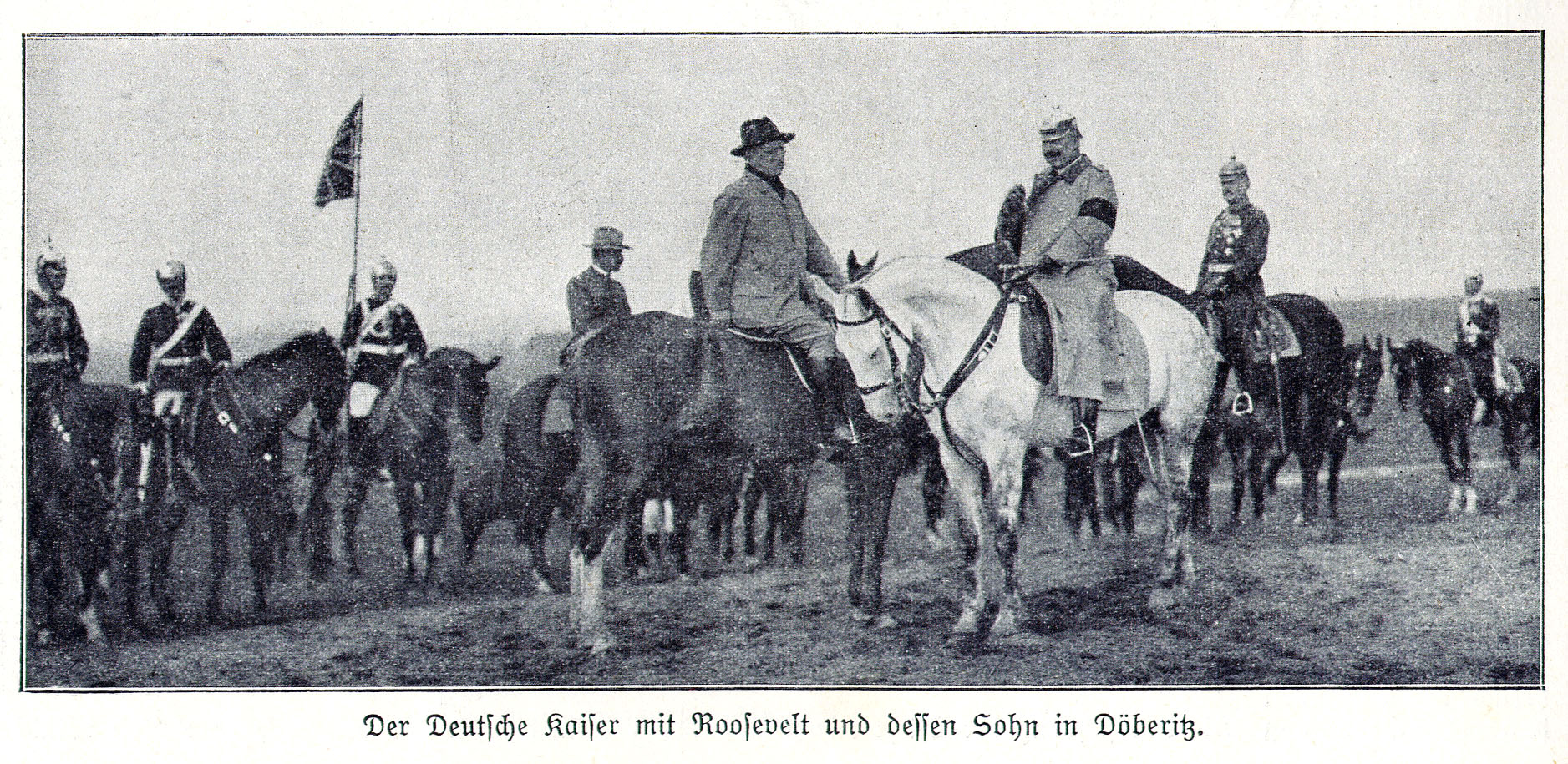
Theodore Roosevelt (center) with his son Kermit (left) and Emperor Wilhelm II. (on the white horse) at a military parade in Döberitz, May 1910

The training area was named after the former village of Döberitz, which lay in the middle of the area. In 1895, the village of Döberitz was cleared of its last inhabitants. After the evacuation, the guard and work command moved into the buildings in the village. In the presence of Emperor Wilhelm II., the Döberitz Training Area and the Guard camp were opened for use on April 1, 1895. The area initially served as a training ground for the Guard Corps. In the first decade of the 20th century, the Heerstraße (today's B 5) was expanded at military request. This served as a direct connection between Berlin and the training area. In 1901, the Observation balloons of the Luftschiffertruppen (Airship Troops) received the first airship battalion.

From 1910, the Döberitz Airfield with flying school was established, which was to become significant for the first military use of aircraft in Germany. Initially not a separate branch of the armed forces, it was subordinated to the Army until 1916. Döberitz is thus the birthplace of the German Air Force.

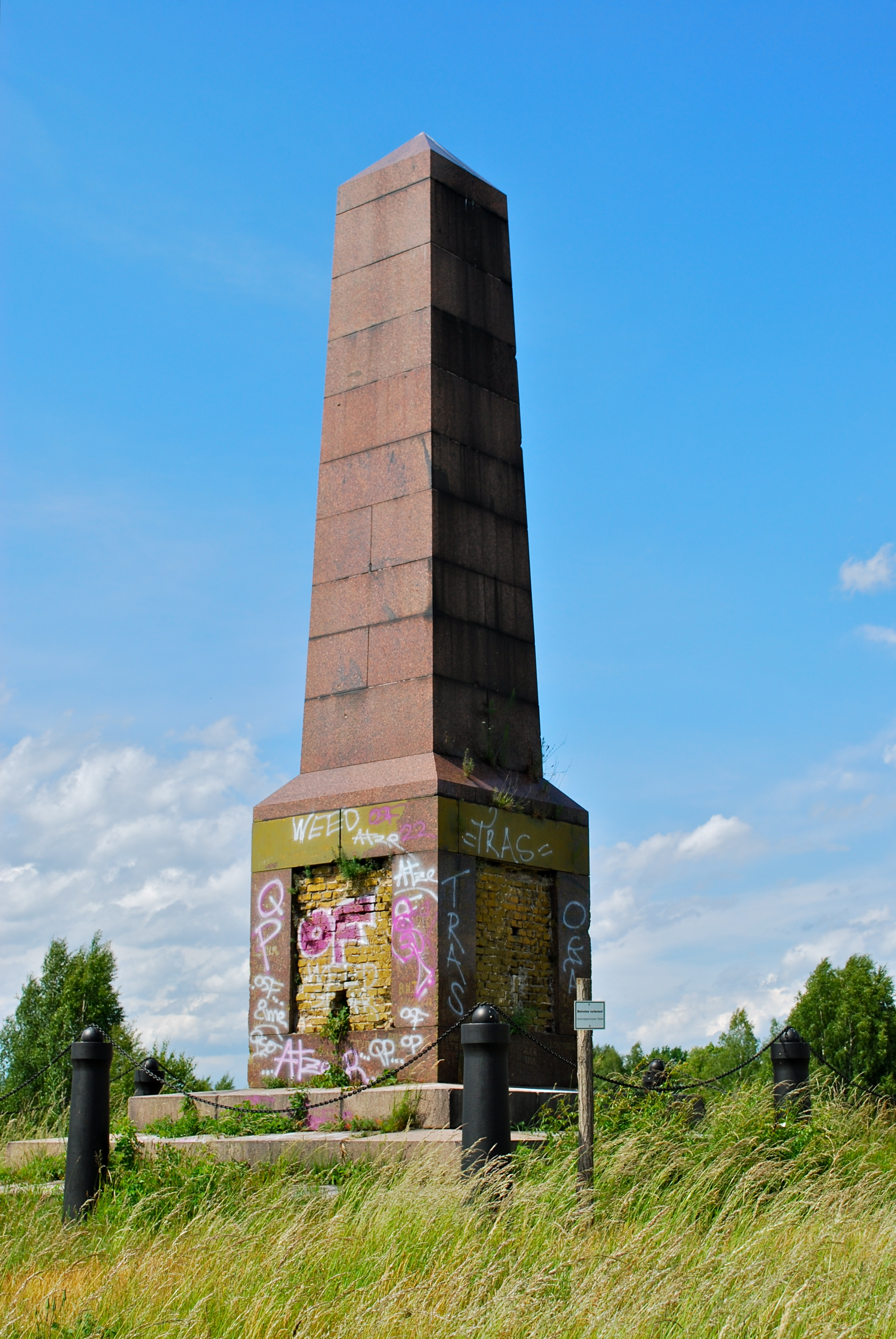
The obelisk on the training area, erected by Emperor Wilhelm II, was heavily damaged by vandalism.

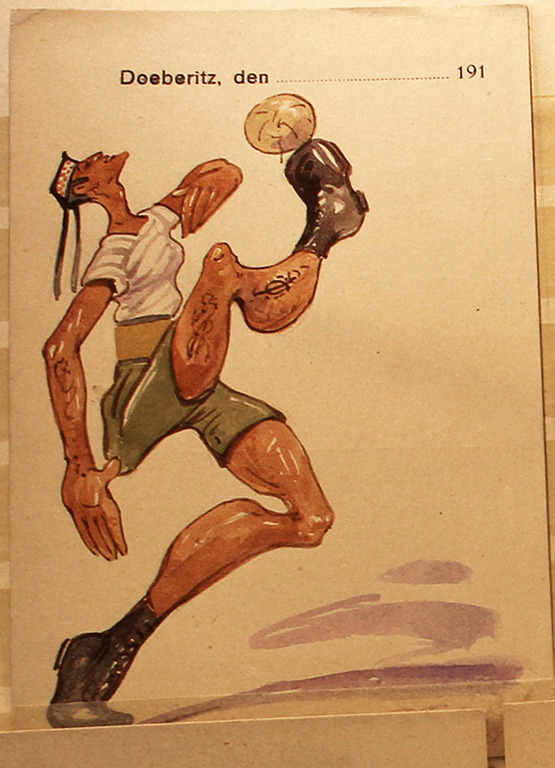
Prisoner of war caricature

At the beginning of the First World War, a provisional prisoner of war camp was set up at the western edge of the camp, which was expanded in 1915 to two newly built camps by prisoners of war at Rohrbeck and Dyrotz. By October 1918, more than 30,000 prisoners from seven nations were interned there

After the First World War, the Reichswehr, associations of the Black Reichswehr, and nationalist military associations used the training area and its facilities.

In November 1919, the Freikorps-Brigade Ehrhardt (Marinebrigade Ehrhardt Volunteer Corps) was relocated from Upper Silesia to the Döberitz camp. In March 1920, the order was given to disband the brigade. Its leaders – determined to resist disbandment – appealed to General Walther von Lüttwitz in Berlin. Lüttwitz, one of the organizers of the Freikorps in 1918 and 1919, turned to Reich President Friedrich Ebert and Reichswehr Minister Gustav Noske to stop the disbandment. When Ebert refused, Lüttwitz ordered the brigade to march to Berlin. On the night of March 12 to 13, 1920, the brigade marched to Berlin and occupied the city during the Kapp Putsch in 1920.

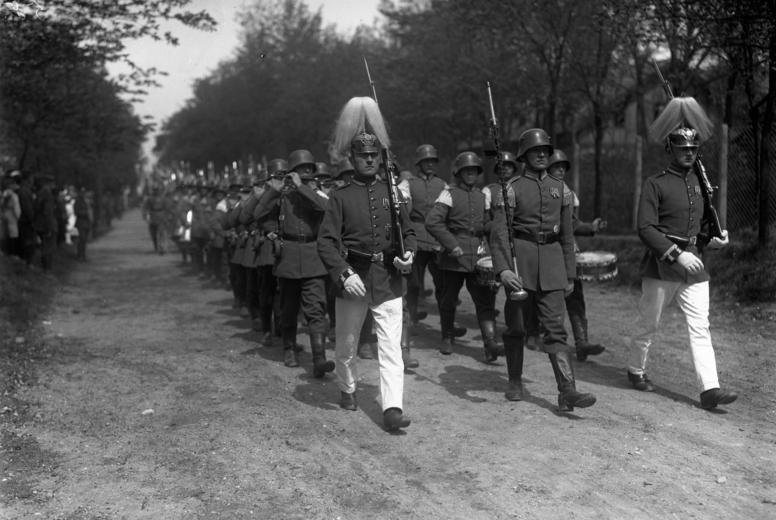
Memorial unveiling of the Lion of Döberitz in May 1923 for the soldiers who fell in the First World War

Shortly before the start of the Second World War, modern combat units were trained and formed here. Especially the sandy, dry soil of the heathland made the training area ideal for testing tank weapons, and it was continuously expanded. Thus, among others, the Panzergrenadier Division Großdeutschland from the Wachregiment Berlin (Berlin Guard Regiment) and parts of the Infantry Teaching Regiment were formed here. The Döberitz Airfield was also used for training pilots and paratroopers. In 1936, the 1st Paratroop Panzer Division Hermann Göring was formed and trained here. In 1938, the Berlin architects Mohr & Weidner were commissioned by the Wehrmacht to construct buildings on the site for the Kraftfahr-Versuchsanstalt.

During the 1936 Summer Olympics, the competitions in eventing and the cross-country ride in the Modern Pentathlon took place on the site.

From 1944 until the end of the war, there were subcamps of Sachsenhausen concentration camp for men and Uckermark concentration camp for girls and young women, as well as a forced labor camp in Dallgow-Döberitz, where Soviet prisoners of war were interned.

The last military unit was the Infantry Division Potsdam, which was formed here on March 29, 1945, as part of the 12th Army of General Walther Wenck.

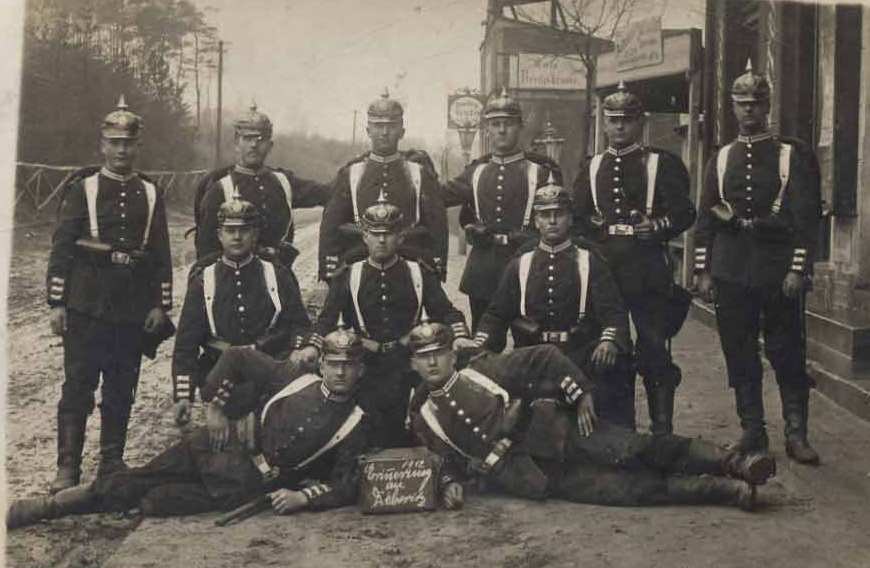
Soldiers on the military training area, 1912

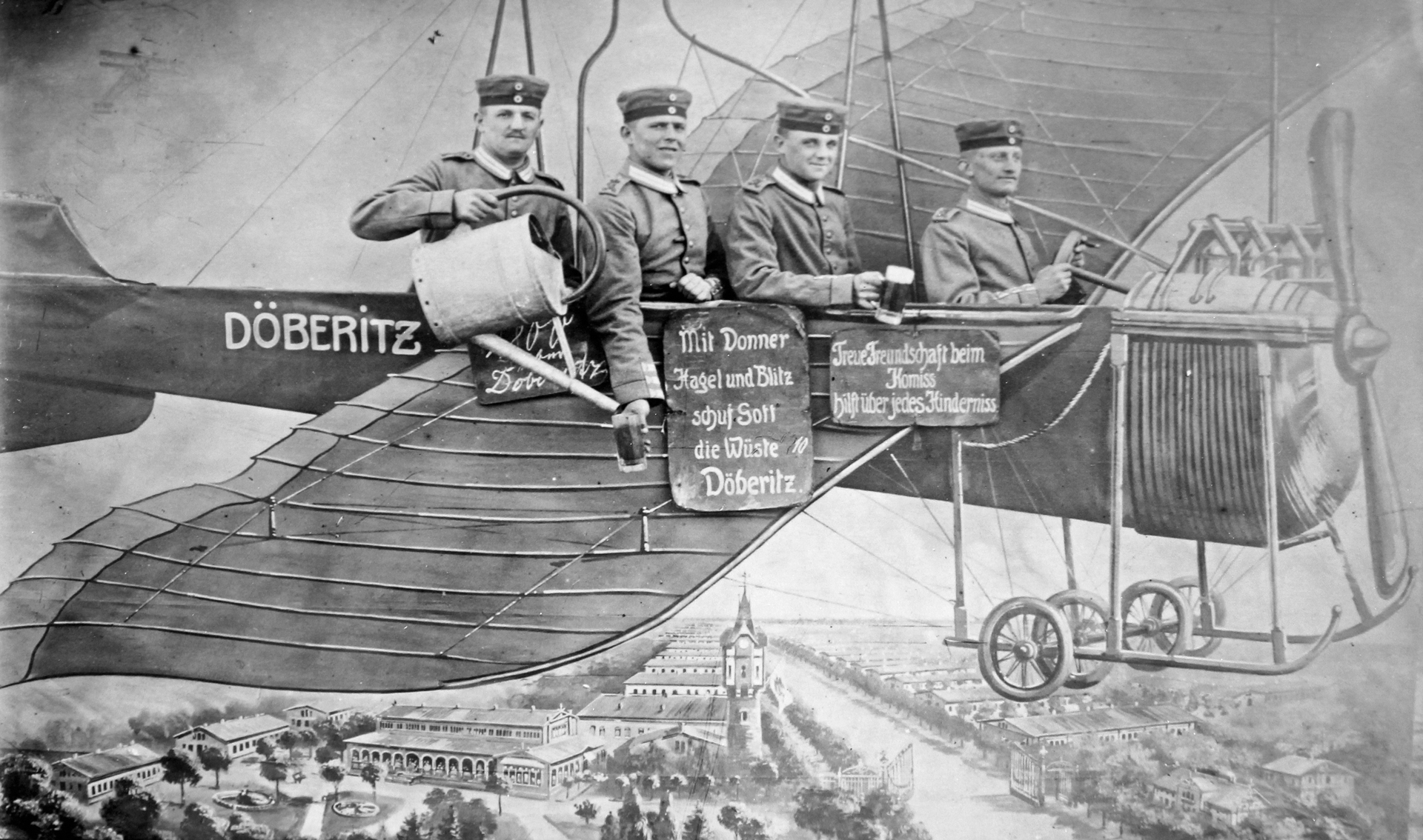
Military souvenir photo from May 1914

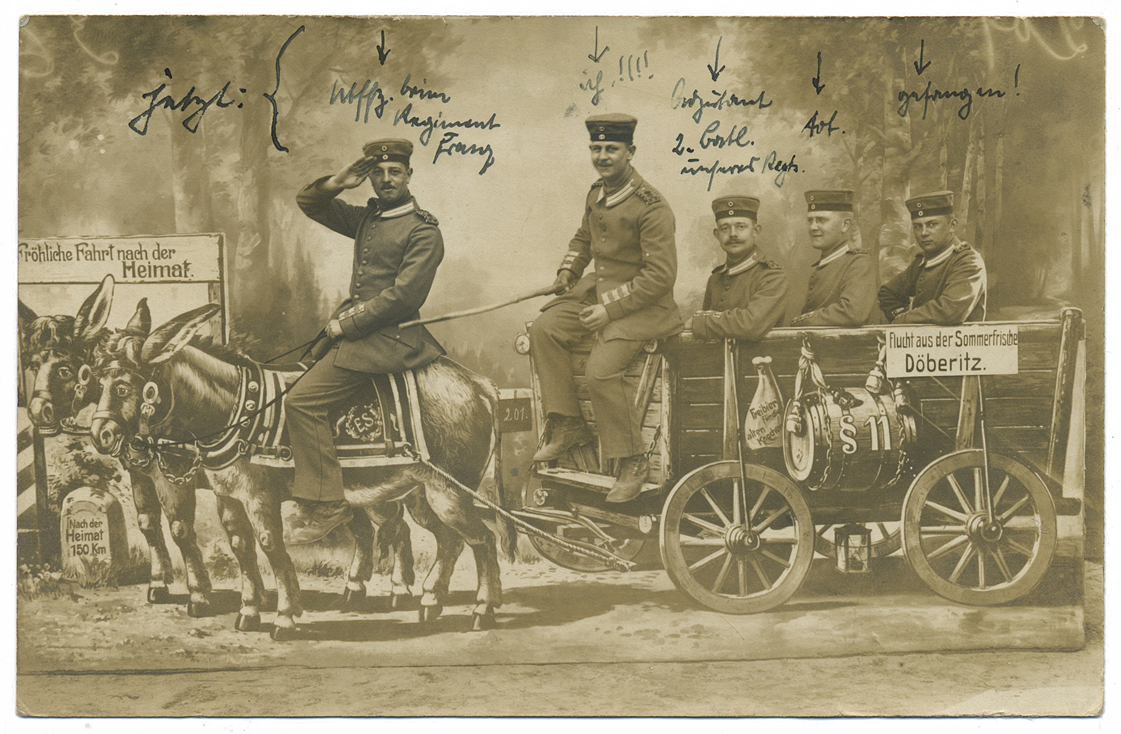
The war events of 1915 appear for the first time on a picture postcard

After the Second World War, the area was briefly converted into a refugee camp, but in 1947 the Soviet Army took over the site. Up to 20,000 soldiers were housed there. In 1992, the military use of the site ended with the withdrawal of the troops. Since 1996, the Bundeswehr has been using a 600-hectare part of the site in the south as a training area for motor vehicles.

== Post-military use and conservation ==
The barracks buildings were gutted in 1994 and have been gradually demolished since then. The resulting wasteland is being developed as new housing areas, which are again based on the layout of the former camp structure. The levelled airport site and Döberitzer Heide area has been managed as a wildlife enclosure by The Heinz Sielmann Foundation since 2004, and the training area has been a Naturschutzgebiet (nature reserve) crossed by hiking trails since 1997.

The site has not been fully cleared of explosives from its previous use as a military training grounds.

== Instructors, commanders and graduates ==
- Walter Buch
- Gertrud Kolmar translator and censor in the Russian prisoner of war camp
- Hans-Valentin Hube
- Heinrich Hogrebe
- Carl Rodenburg
- Otto Wagener
- Walter Hahm
- Mario Zippermayr
- Kurt Andersen
- Hermann Ehrhardt
- Albrecht Schoenhals
- Herbert Otto Gille
