= Sturlason AS Polyfoto =

Norwegian photo studio founded in 1933

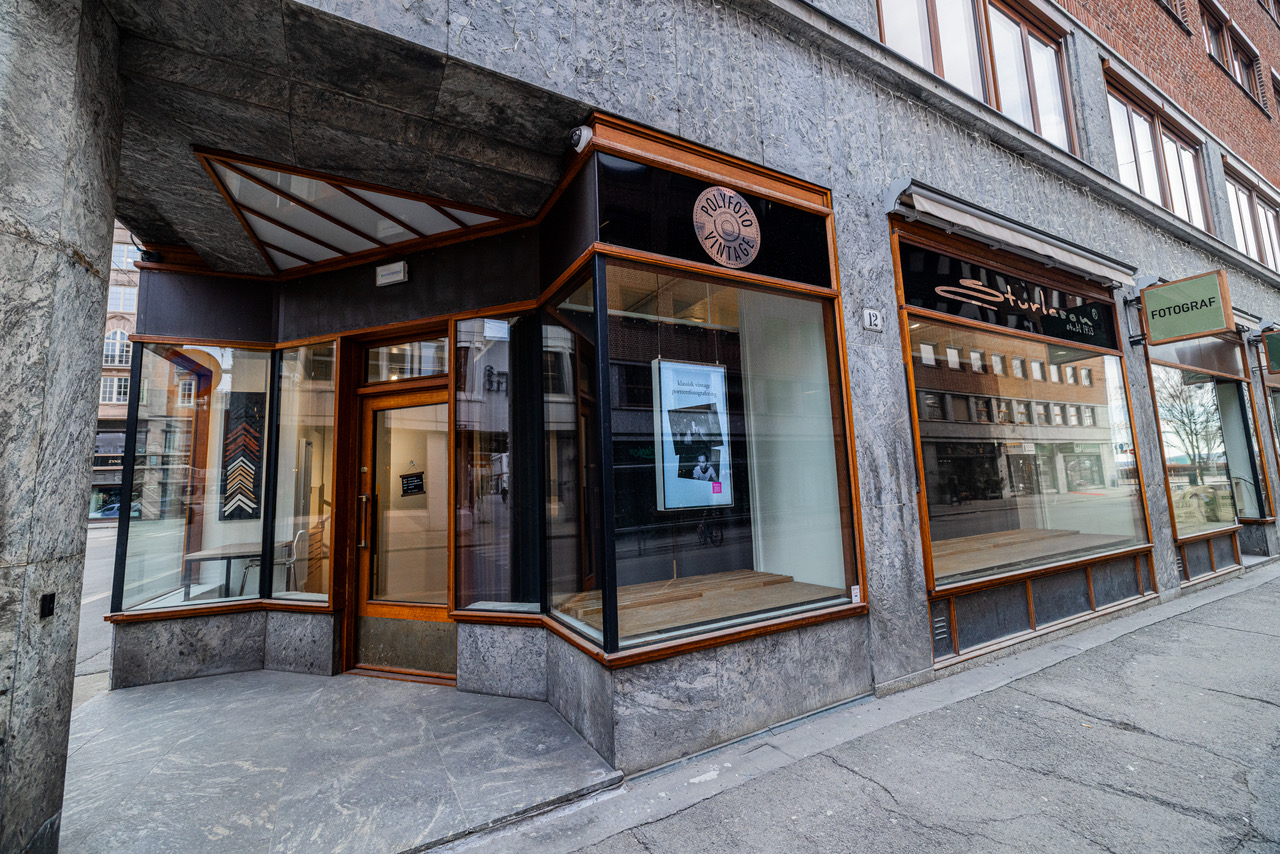
- The current studio in Tordenskiolds gate 12, central Oslo.
- Company type: Private limited company
- Industry: Photography, image production, framing
- Founded: October 20, 1933; 91 years ago
- Founder: Svein Abraham Sturlason
- Headquarters: Oslo, Norway
- Area served: Norway
- Key people: Espen Sturlason (CEO)
- Owner: Espen Sturlason
- Website: sturlason.no

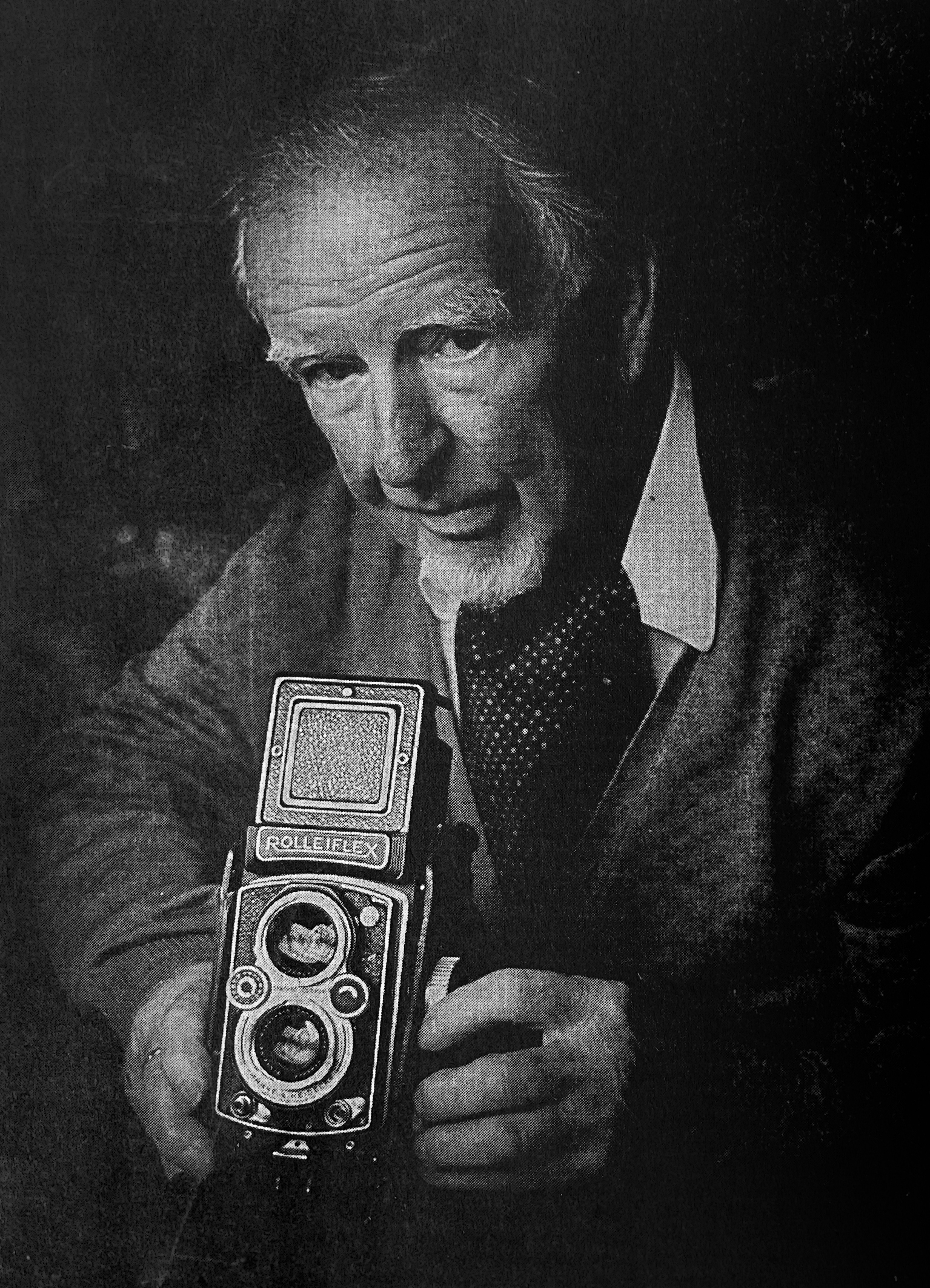
Svein Abraham Sturlason, 1983

Sturlason AS Polyfoto is a Norwegian photography company in Oslo founded in 1933 by photographer Svein Abraham Sturlason (1906–1989). The company has played an active role in the development of Norwegian photography over three generations, with a notable legacy in portraiture, press, and theatre photography. It has also been involved in feature film production and in the preservation and digitization of Norwegian visual history.

== History ==
=== Early years ===
Svein Abraham Sturlason was born in Tønsberg, Norway, in 1906. After completing his photography apprenticeship, he worked with renowned photographers including Ernest Rude and Gunnar Theodor Sjøwall in Oslo. In 1933, he became the manager of the newly established Polyfoto studio, located in the Morgenbladet building in central Oslo. The Polyfoto concept offered customers 48 small portraits on a single plate at an affordable price. This mass production approach sparked controversy among traditional photographers but gained popularity with the public.

=== World War II and resistance work ===
During the German occupation of Norway, Sturlason became part of the resistance movement, operating under the codename "Dr. X". His studio and lab were used to produce illegal materials, including microfilm. At the same time, he continued to operate a portrait studio for civilians and German soldiers alike, using the access to acquire photographic supplies. After the war, he received the Norwegian Defense Medal for his contributions.

=== Postwar expansion and press photography ===
After the war, Sturlason acquired Myres Pressebyrå and established his own press agency, which became one of Norway's most prominent. The agency documented national events, theatre productions, sports and royal ceremonies, and collaborated with international distributors. At its height, the company employed more than 50 people and trained many of Norway's leading professional photographers.

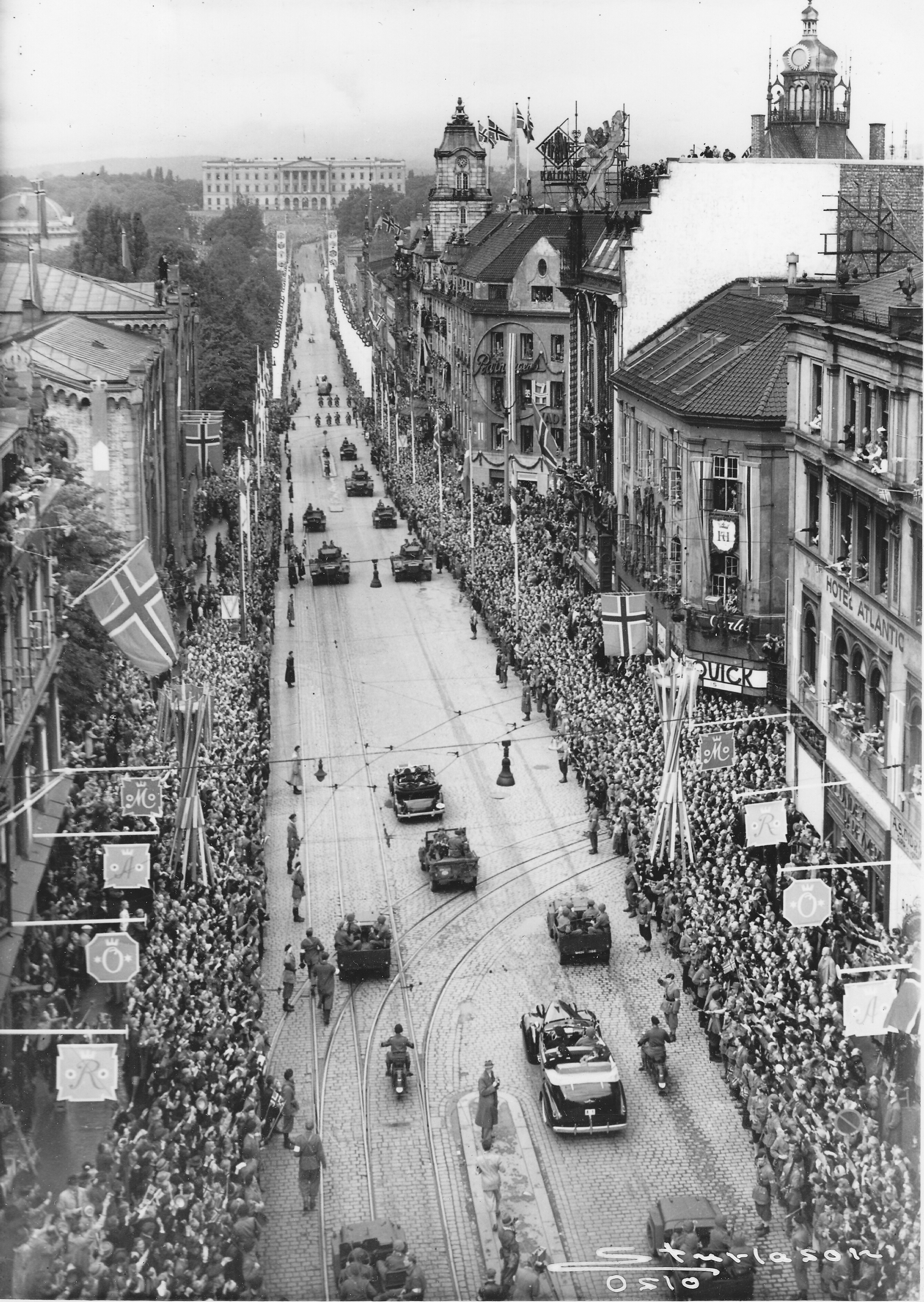
Liberation day, Oslo 1945, Photo: Sturlason

=== Theatre photography and film ===
Sturlason was a theatre photographer, documenting over 2150 stage productions between 1942 and 1980. He also founded the production company Snorre Film, which produced Norwegian feature films such as Bør Børson (1938) and Englandsfarere (1946).

=== Second and third generation ===
Svein Sturlason (b. 1940), the son of the founder, took over the business in 1972 and reorganized the company to focus on portrait photography. The press agency was closed in 1979. His wife Inger Sturlason specialized in wedding and family portraits during the 1980s and 1990s.

In 2009, Espen Sturlason (b. 1977) became the third-generation leader of the company. He has overseen the company's transition to digital photography. He was part of the official photography team during the royal wedding of Crown Prince Haakon and Princess Mette-Marit in 2001.

=== Archives ===
The company maintains an archive of over one million historical images from Norwegian history. In 2010, the archive was reopened and later transferred to the National Archives of Norway (Riksarkivet), with support from the Arts Council Norway and Fritt Ord. Gabriele Sturlason has led the digitization project under the name Polyfoto Vintage. In 2016, selected images were exhibited at the Royal Albert Hall in London.

== Locations ==
Sturlason AS Polyfoto has been based in central Oslo since its founding, with studios and labs previously located in Roald Amundsens gate, Stortingsgaten, and Skovveien. The current studio is located in Tordenskiolds gate 12, Oslo, with a second location in Asker.

== See also ==
- Photography in Norway
