= Seeberg (disambiguation) =

- Seeberg
- Styrian Seeberg Pass
- Seeberg lake
- Seeberg observatory
- 8130 Seeberg
- Seeberg Saddle

== People ==
- Evald Seeberg (1911–1990), the birth name of Evald Seepere, Estonian boxer
- Hans Seeberg (1904–1984), Norwegian marketing agent
- Gitte Seeberg (born 1960), Danish politician and lawyer
- Peter Seeberg (1925–1999), Danish novelist and playwright
- Tom Seeberg (1860–1938), Norwegian sport shooter
- Valborg Seeberg (1851–1929), Norwegian author
- Xenia Seeberg (born 1967), German actress

== See also ==
- Seeburg (disambiguation)
