= Luca Kleve-Ruud =

Norwegian photographer

Luca Kleve-Ruud (born 27 April 1978 in Pescara, Italy) is a Norwegian press photographer, based in Oslo.

Kleve-Ruud studied photojournalism at Høgskolen i Oslo. He is currently working for Dagens Næringsliv, Save the Children, and Samfoto/Scanpix, but has done several assignments for Red Cross, Amnesty and others. And was both freelance and staff photographer at Dagsavisen from 2006 to 2011. His pictures are featured in many magazines, newspapers and books.

== Awards ==
2012

- 2. Prize Video Documentary

2011

- Main Prize – Picture of the year, 2011
- 1. Prize News story – Picture of the year, 2011
- 1. Prize News – Picture of the year, 2011

2010

- 1. Prize News – Picture of the year, 2010

2009

- 1. Prize Portrait – Picture of the year, 2009
- 2. Prize Domestic documentary – Picture of the year, 2009

== Book contributions ==
- Teddy Petersen, ed. Sort of Safe: Photo Essays on Nordic Welfare. Århus: Ajour, 2009. ISBN 87-92241-32-8. (in Danish and English)
