= Samfoto =

Norwegian photography agency active from 1976-2011

Samfoto Picture Agency was a photographer-run Norwegian photography agency established in 1976. In 2011, it was bought by NTB Scanpix. Samfoto was photographer-run and primarily sold stock photographs to Norwegian media.

Samfoto represented a large number of Norwegian and Scandinavian freelance photographers, and its archive includes more than 300 000 images.

== History ==
Samfoto was founded by six photographers in 1976, inspired by the photo cooperative Magnum Photos, and based on the philosophy of a picture agency run by photographers. Five of the photographers worked freelance, and the sixth was a permanently employed executive officer. Among the six were Per-Anders Rosenkvist, Sven Erik Dahl, Rune Lislerud and Geir Bølstand, who met in Studentenes fotoklubb (The Students' Photo Club) at the University of Oslo and founded Fotogruppe 72 together; this group was established in the wake of the 1972 referendum on Norwegian membership in the European Communities. In Samfoto's early years, the company signed all of their photographs collectively.

Several of the photographers were left-wing political activists, and they documented demonstrations, house occupations and society from a political point of view. According to Rosenkvist, this led to Samfoto's phone line and "all" the photographers being surveilled. Profit was not Samfoto's primary concern, and they aimed to provide "sociocritical and documentative" photography, especially on topics they had deemed to be poorly understood by the public. Samfoto's politics were reflected in which work they chose to carry out; they did not do advertising work, nor did they provide erotic photography for men's magazines. In their early years, they did frequent work for the Marxist–Leninist newspaper Klassekampen. As the company became more professional, their politics started playing a smaller role in who they chose to work with; in 1982, Svein Erik Dahl stated "[e]arlier we thought politically. Now we think professionally". In 1995, they stated that they had become more commercial so their photographers could make a living.

Approximately 100 Norwegian photographers joined Samfoto in the eighties and nineties. At its peak, around 200 freelance photographers were affiliated with Samfoto. In 1988 the association Norwegian Nature Photographers began collaborating with the agency. In 1989 four of the photographers in the women's photography association Hera joined Samfoto to have better support in distributing and selling their photographs.

In 1997, Samfoto closed their darkroom as they transitioned to digital photography. In 1995, they had one person working part-time in the darkroom.

In the years 2000–2001 distribution of pictures from the archive was changed from physical to digital and the Samfoto archive was launched on the Internet. The transition from analogue to digital images was challenging, and for a period they had to produce digital files, slides and print copies of photos. By their 30th anniversary, in 2006, a hundred photographers were affiliated with the service.

== Legacy ==
In 2011 Samfoto was purchased by Scanpix, a company that is owned by the Norwegian News Agency (NTB). At the time, NTB said that Samfoto would continue to use its own name and had a separate archive, but as of 2025 it no longer exists as a separate entity.

The Norwegian media still frequently publishes stock photos that are copyrighted to Samfoto. As of 2025, Samfoto's archives are searchable at NTB Bilder by using the search term "Samfoto".
