= Dallgow-Döberitz =

- Municipality
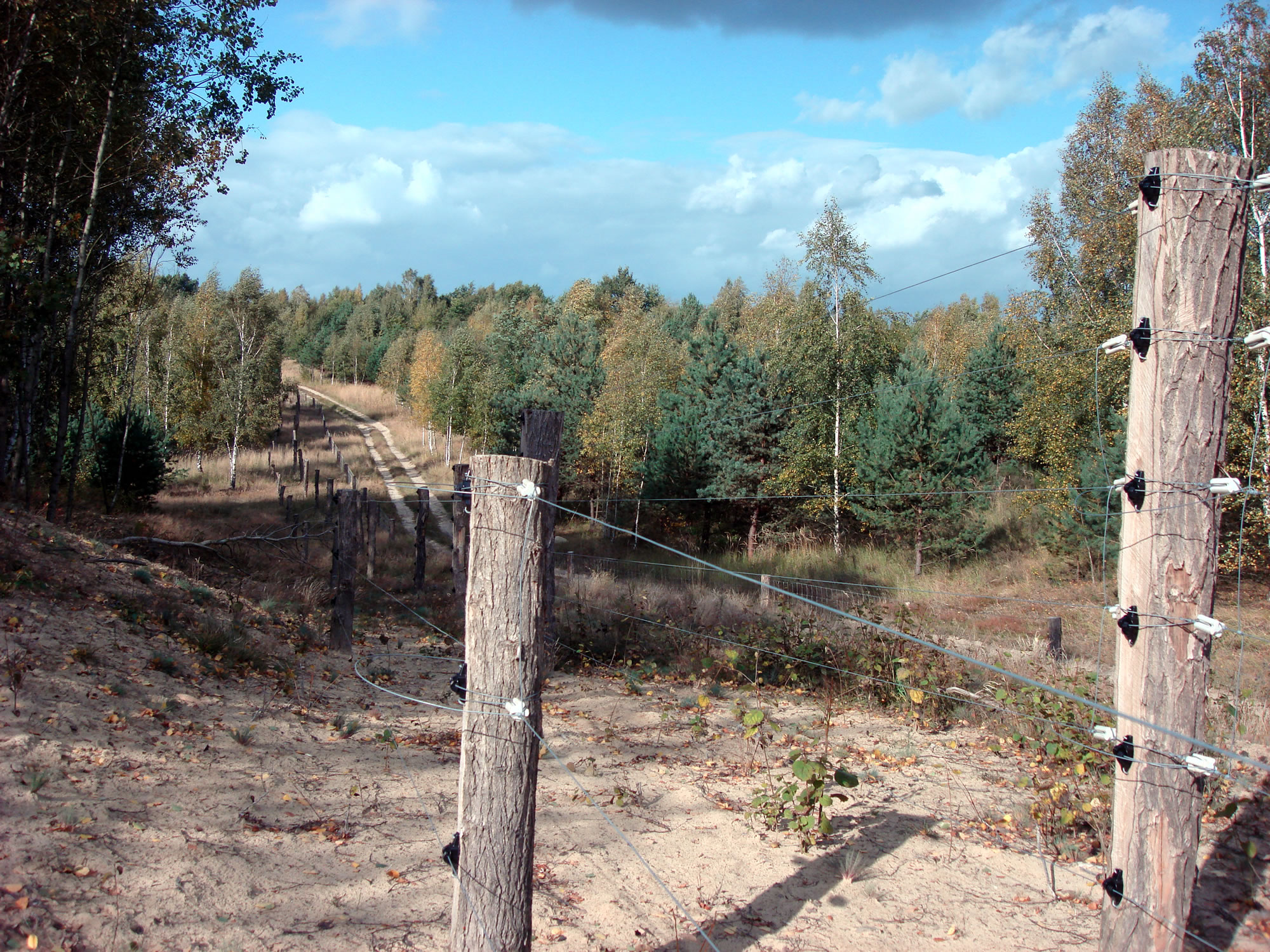
- A view of the Döberitzer Heide

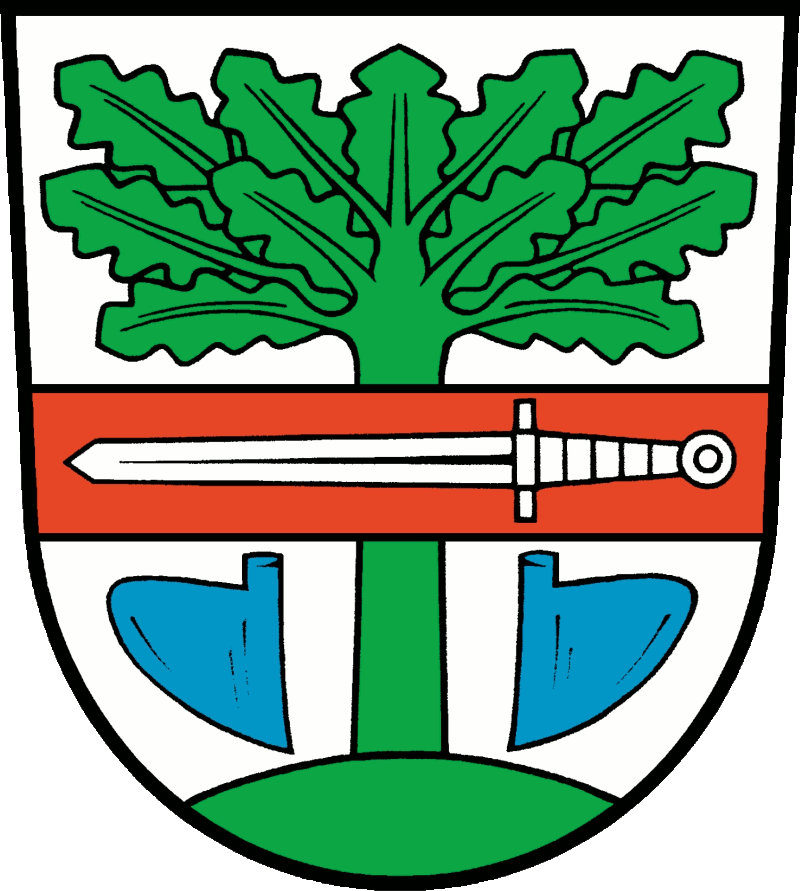
- Coat of arms

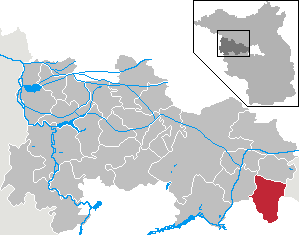
- Location of Dallgow-Döberitz within Havelland district
- Interactive map of Dallgow-Döberitz
- Location within Germany Location within Brandenburg
- Coordinates: 52°31′59″N 13°03′00″E
- Country: Germany
- State: Brandenburg
- District: Havelland

Government
  - Mayor (2020–28): Sven Richter (CDU)

Area
  - Total: 66.53 km^{2} (25.69 sq mi)
- Elevation: 37 m (121 ft)

Population (2025-12-31)
  - Total: 10,860
  - Density: 163.2/km^{2} (422.8/sq mi)
- Time zone: UTC+01:00 (CET)
  - Summer (DST): UTC+02:00 (CEST)
- Postal codes: 14624
- Dialling codes: 03322
- Vehicle registration: HVL
- Website: www.dallgow.de

Dallgow-Döberitz (German pronunciation: [ˈdalɡoː ˈdøːbəʁɪts]) is a municipality in the Havelland district, in Brandenburg, in eastern Germany.

== Geography ==
It consists of the villages of Dallgow-Döberitz, Rohrbeck and Seeburg. To the east it shares border with the Spandau borough of Berlin. Neighbouring Brandenburg municipalities are Falkensee in the north and Wustermark in the west. In the south is the large former proving ground Döberitzer Heide, now mainly a nature reserve governed by the Heinz Sielmann Foundation.

=== Districts of Dallgow-Döberitz ===
- Dallgow (with Neu-Döberitz)
- Rohrbeck
- Seeburg

== History ==
The Imperial German Army established a military training area in 1894 around the village of Döberitz, which had to be abandoned by its inhabitants. Its pioneering airfield was, in late 1915, the place where the world's first practical all-metal aircraft, the Junkers J 1, made its pioneering flights.

During the 1936 Summer Olympics in neighboring Berlin, it hosted the riding part of the modern pentathlon and part of the equestrian eventing competitions.

During World War II, Döberitz was the location of a subcamp of the Sachsenhausen concentration camp for French, Polish, Soviet, and possibly Belgian prisoners.

Between 1945 and 1951 Dallgow served as East German border crossing for cars travelling along F 5 between the Soviet Zone of occupation in Germany (till 1949, thereafter the East German Democratic Republic) or the British Zone of Occupation (till 1949) and thereafter the West German Federal Republic of Germany and West Berlin. The traffic was subject to the Interzonal traffic regulations. After the East German Volkspolizei took control of West-Staaken on 1 February 1951 the checkpoint was moved eastwards.

The municipality shared its borders with the former West Berlin, and so during the period 1961-1990 it was separated from it by the Berlin Wall.

The 2008 film The Wave was filmed at the Marie Curie Gymnasium in this municipality.

== Demography ==
Development of Population since 1875 within the Current Boundaries (Blue Line: Population; Dotted Line: Comparison to Population Development of Brandenburg state; Grey Background: Time of Nazi rule; Red Background: Time of Communist rule)

Recent Population Development and Projections (Population Development before Census 2011 (blue line); Recent Population Development according to the Census in Germany in 2011 (blue bordered line); Official projections for 2005-2030 (yellow line); for 2017-2030 (scarlet line); for 2020-2030 (green line)

Dallgow-Döberitz: Population development
within the current boundaries (2020)

Year	Pop.	±% p.a.
1875	1,214	—
1890	1,381	+0.86%
1910	1,870	+1.53%
1925	2,378	+1.62%
1939	5,355	+5.97%
1950	4,890	−0.82%
1964	4,209	−1.07%

Year	Pop.	±% p.a.
1971	4,241	+0.11%
1981	3,826	−1.02%
1985	3,711	−0.76%
1990	3,469	−1.34%
1995	4,075	+3.27%
2000	6,444	+9.60%
2005	7,786	+3.86%

Year	Pop.	±% p.a.
2010	8,636	+2.09%
2015	9,700	+2.35%
2016	9,940	+2.47%
2017	9,956	+0.16%
2018	9,931	−0.25%
2019	10,019	+0.89%
2020	10,298	+2.78%
