= Seeburg =

Seeburg may refer to:

== Places ==
- Seeburg, Brandenburg, part of the municipality of Dallgow-Döberitz, Brandenburg, Germany
- Seeburg, Lower Saxony, in the district of Göttingen, Lower Saxony, Germany
- Seeburg, Lucerne, a suburb of the city of Lucerne, Switzerland
- Seeburg, Saxony-Anhalt, in the district Mansfeld-Südharz, Saxony-Anhalt, Germany
- Seeburg, the German name for Jeziorany, in the Warmian-Masurian Voivodeship, Poland
- Grobiņa in Latvia.

== Other ==
- Seeburg Corporation, an American company that produced jukeboxes 1928–1989
  - Seeburg 1000, phonograph
- Seeburg plotting table, (in German: Seeburg-Tisch), a table that was used to track and control aircraft during WWII.

== People ==
- Wichmann von Seeburg (died 1192), Archbishop of Magdeburg

== See also ==
- Seeberg (disambiguation)
