= Pål Bjerketvedt =

Norwegian journalist

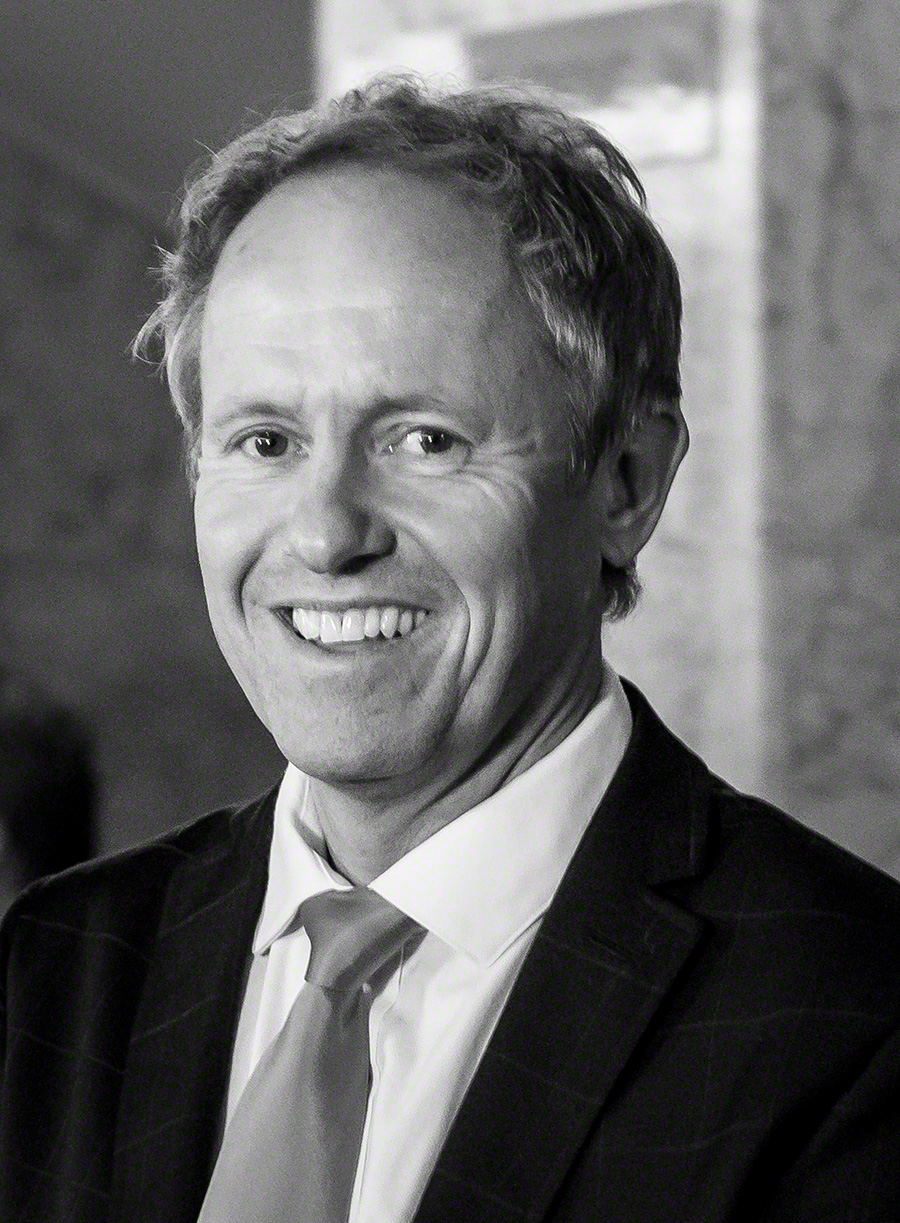
Bjerketvedt in 2016

Paul Asbjørn Bjerketvedt is a Norwegian media executive and editor. He has been Chief Executive Officer of the Norwegian News Agency (NTB) since 2004, playing a central role in shaping the organization's strategic direction and journalistic standards. In recognition of his contributions to Norwegian-language media, Bjerketvedt was honored with the Nynorsk Editor Award in 2008.
