= Tina Mari Flem =

Norwegian editor and media executive (born 1980)

- Born: 28 August 1980 (age 46); Ålesund, Norway
- Education: University of Queensland
- Occupations: Editor and media executive
- Employer: Norwegian News Agency

Tina Mari Flem (born 28 August 1980) is a Norwegian editor and media executive. Since 2021, she has been chief editor and managing director of the Norwegian News Agency.

== Life and career ==
Born in Ålesund on 28 August 1980, Flem graduated with a bachelor degree in journalism from the University of Queensland in 2004.

She was journalist for the local newspaper Haramsnytt from 2004, and was assigned with Posten Norge from 2006 to 2017, and with the Norwegian News Agency from 2017. In December 2021, she was appointed as chief editor and managing director for the Norwegian News Agency, succeeding Mads Yngve Storvik.
