= Photography in Norway =

As in many countries, the science, craft, and art of photography in Norway has evolved as a result of changing technology, improving economic conditions, and the level of acceptance of photography as an art form in its own right.

== History ==
The first known photography in Norway dates from 1839, when Hans Thøger Winther bought his first camera. The oldest image on file is one of his pictures from 1840. Daguerreotypes became popular in the 1840s, and several entrepreneurial photographers established studios in major cities for portrait photography and also took portable studios to smaller population centers. Winther published a number of articles on photography in newspapers and published a book in 1845 titled:

"Instructions on how in various ways to produce and establish IMAGES OF LIGHT on paper, such as portraits of living persons, prospects of nature, copies of paintings, plastic copper items, stone prints, leaves of plants, etc., partly by using a camera obscura, partly with an instrument for copying"

Portrait photography became more affordable and commonplace throughout the 19th century, and around 1860 landscape photography took root in Norway. Marcus Selmer is considered to be the first landscape photographer with considerable production, but Knud Knudsen and the Swede Axel Lindahl made the most systematic efforts in traveling and capturing landscapes.

From the late 19th, century until World War I, photographers set up shop throughout Norway. Many women were among them.

In 1901, Anders Beer Wilse returned from the United States. He became one of the most famous photographers in Norway. In addition to documenting natural landscapes and ethnology throughout Norway, he was also an accomplished portrait and architecture photographer.

Although dominated primarily by German influences in the late 19th century, Pictorialism caught on in Norway when it did elsewhere in the world and was promoted by the Oslo camera club, founded in 1921. Photographers whose work represents Norwegian pictorialism include Robert Collett, Aage Remfeldt, Thomas Blehr, and Waldemar Eide.

Around World War I, portrait photography in Norway became more of an expressive art as a result of the work of Waldemar Eide, Dimitri Koloboff, Gunnar Theodor Sjøwall, Aage Remfeldt, Hans Johnsrud and Anders Beer Wilse.

== Photojournalism ==
In confluence with the growth of the socialist movement in Norway, the Neue Sachlichkeit movement also influenced Norwegian photography. With the rise of photojournalism, the ethnological legacy of Norwegian photography gave rise to a growing interest in making social and political commentary through the camera.

== Artistic expression ==
In 1971, the first photographic work (by Kåre Kivijärvi) was accepted at the prestigious Autumn Exhibition in Oslo, marking the widespread acceptance of photography as an art form.

== Photographic archives ==
Efforts to preserve photographic works in Norway is coordinated through the Norwegian Ministry of Culture, has been made the responsibility of the Norwegian Archive, Library and Museum Authority, the Preus Museum, and the National Library of Norway. Archives are funded through the Norwegian Cultural Council, public funding of related topical areas, and revenue generated by reproductions and other services.

In 1928, the first initiative to create a national photographic archive was started through the formation of an iconographic commission. This was initially intended as a means to preserve historical visual records, but over time the interest increased in photographic archives that also preserved the craft, art, and technology of photography.

In addition to central archives in the National Library's facilities and at the Preus Museum, there are 25 regional archives, organized by counties. A number of local libraries, museums, and other institutions also maintain photography archives.
