= Odd Myre =

Norwegian marketing agent (1912–2005)

Odd Myre (9 November 1912 – 4 July 2005) was a Norwegian marketing agent.

He was a son of Olav Myre, who founded the news agency Myres Pressebyrå in 1910. In 1935, Odd Myre took over the company, which had been supplemented with advertising in 1918. Due to new laws, the advertising and news section had to be split, and the company was carried on as Myres Reklamebyrå, purely with advertising. Myre sat as CEO of the company until 1968. He was succeeded by Asbjørn Sæthre, who sat until 1998. The company was merged with BBDO in 1999.

In 1958, he co-founded the Institute of Marketing (Institutt for Markedsføring). It was modelled on the English Institute of Practitioners in Advertising, and owned by the Norwegian Association of Advertising Agencies. In the same year, he succeeded Hans Chr. Seeberg as board chairman of the Association of Advertising Agencies, a position he held until 1962. He also co-founded the European Association of Advertising Agencies.

Myre was active in the Riksmål movement, and he strongly supported a strong military defence. He participated in World War II resistance himself, and was decorated with the Defence Medal 1940–1945. He was married, had six daughters and died in 2005. He was buried at Vestre gravlund.
