= Norwegian News Agency =

Norwegian press agency and wire service

Norsk Telegrambyrå AS
- Company type: Private
- Industry: News agency
- Founded: 1867
- Headquarters: Oslo, Norway
- Area served: Norway
- Key people: Tina Mari Flem (CEO and Editor-in-chief)
- Revenue: NOK 222.3 million (2014)
- Number of employees: 136 (2014)
- Website: ntb.no

The Norwegian News Agency (Norwegian: Norsk Telegrambyrå; NTB) is a Norwegian press agency and wire service that serves most of the largest Norwegian media outlets. The agency is located in Oslo and has bureaus in Brussels in Belgium and Tromsø in northern Norway. NTB operates 24 hours a day, with the night service handled from a bureau in Sydney, Australia since 2015. The photo agency Scanpix is a wholly owned subsidiary of NTB.

== History and profile ==
NTB was established in 1867. In the early years it was privately owned. After World War I, the agency was acquired by AS Norsk Telegrambyrå, a limited company owned by a group of newspapers. Images have been part of their news services since 1932. It is closely held by large media corporations, including Edda Media (26.1%), Schibsted (20.6%), A-Pressen (20.5%), the Norwegian Broadcasting Corporation (10.5%), Adresseavisen (7.8%), a few smaller newspapers, TV 2 and P4. 0.5% is owned by the agency's employees.

The agency has three main news services, covering domestic news, international news, and sports. It also provides special services within news graphics, video, culture, entertainment, feature, etc. Approximately 136 staff are employed by the agency. Pål Bjerketvedt was the editor-in-chief and managing director from 2004 to 2016; Ole Kristian Bjellaanes is the executive editor.

In December 2021 Tina Mari Flem was appointed as chief editor and managing director for the Norwegian News Agency, succeeding Mads Yngve Storvik.
