= Catherine Cameron =

Norwegian artist

- Born: 2 December 1962 (age 62); Oslo
- Known for: Fine art photography,

Catherine Cameron (born 2 December 1962) is an artist from Norway using photography as her prime medium.

== Career ==
Cameron has been working with photography as artistic expression since 1999. Her works have been exhibited in the United Kingdom, USA, Argentina, China, Russia, Poland, France, Italy, Japan and Norway. She is represented within the permanent collections of the Museum of Fine Arts (Houston) and it:Centro internazionale di fotografia Scavi Scaligeri in Verona, Italy. She is a member of Association of Norwegian Visual Artists.

She is based in Scotland.

== Selected solo exhibitions ==
- 2004 Fotografiens Hus, Oslo, Norway
- 2007 LIPF 07, Lianzhou International Photo Festival, China (one of 48 "authors" invited)
- 2007 Galerie Plume, Paris, France
- 2008 Galerie Plume, Paris, France
- 2008 Shanghai Sculpture Space, Shanghai, China
- 2008 Łódź Foto Festiwal 08 Łódź, Polen (Grand Prix juried)
- 2009 Fotofestivalen i Risør, Norway (invited)
