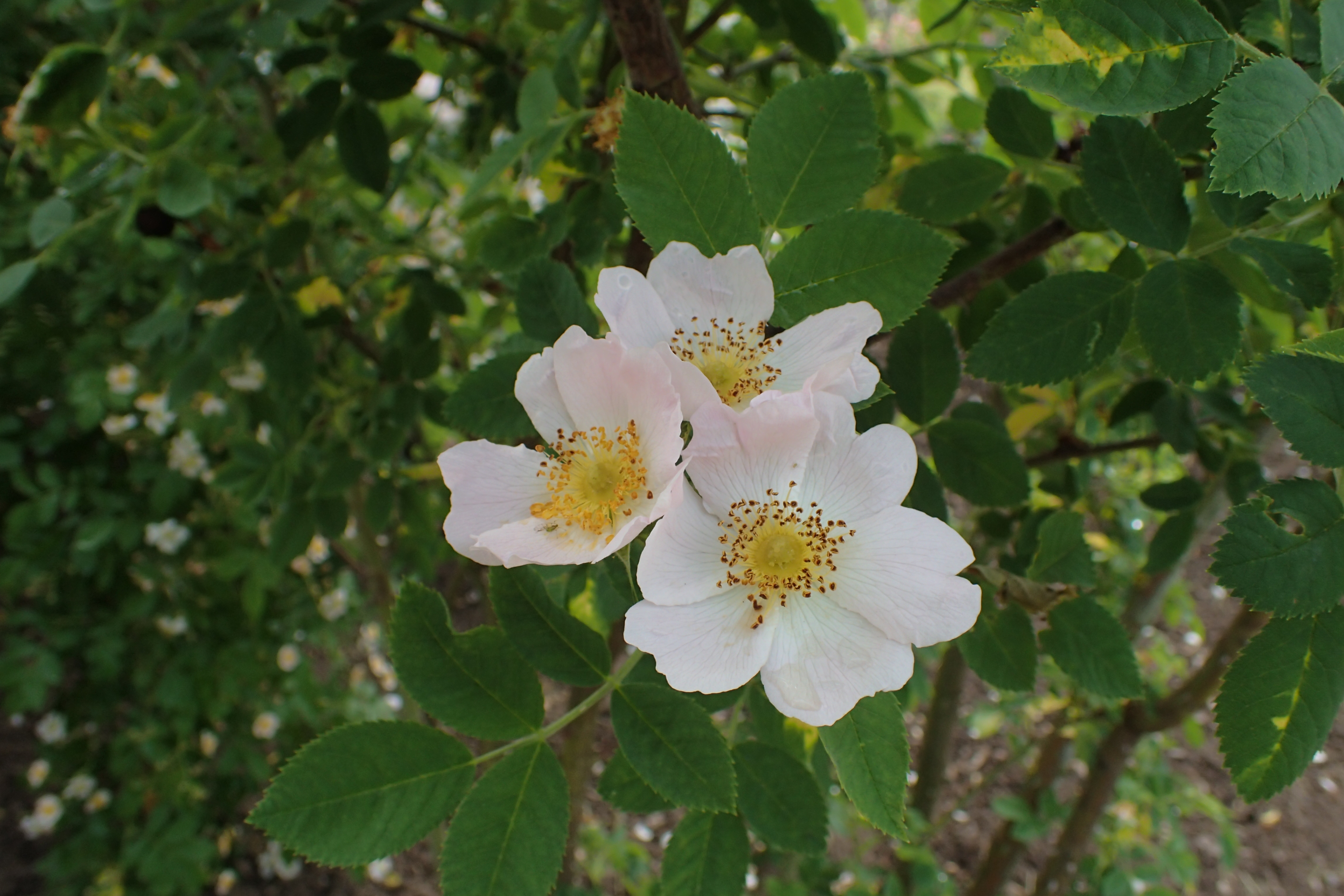

Scientific classification
- Kingdom: Plantae
- Clade: Tracheophytes
- Clade: Angiosperms
- Clade: Eudicots
- Clade: Rosids
- Order: Rosales
- Family: Rosaceae
- Genus: Rosa
- Species: R. caesia

Binomial name
- Rosa caesia Sm.

Synonyms
- Rosa coriifolia Fr.

= Rosa caesia =

Species of flowering plant

Rosa caesia is a species of flowering plant belonging to the family Rosaceae.

It is native to Europe and the Caucasus.
