= Inga Breder =

Norwegian photographer (1855–1933)

Inga Christine Breder (1855 – 28 December 1933) was a Norwegian photographer who made landscapes, urban motifs, portraits, interiors, and still lifes. A member of the Oslo Kamera Klubb, she was the daughter of Paul Peter Vilhelm Breder. Her work is held in the collection of the Preus Museum. Breder was born in Bodø.
