= Severin Worm-Petersen =

Norwegian photographer

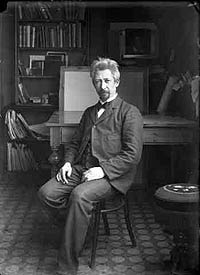
- Born: 2 June 1857
- Died: 30 December 1933 (aged 76)
- Occupation: photographer

Severin Worm-Petersen (2 June 1857 – 30 December 1933) was a Norwegian photographer.

== Biography ==
He learned photography in 1876, at age 19, as an apprentice to John Lindegaard (1830–1889). In 1877 he started his own studio for portrait photography. In 1881 he photographed the unveiling of Brynjulf Bergslien's monument to Henrik Wergeland.
