= Skudde =

Breed of sheep

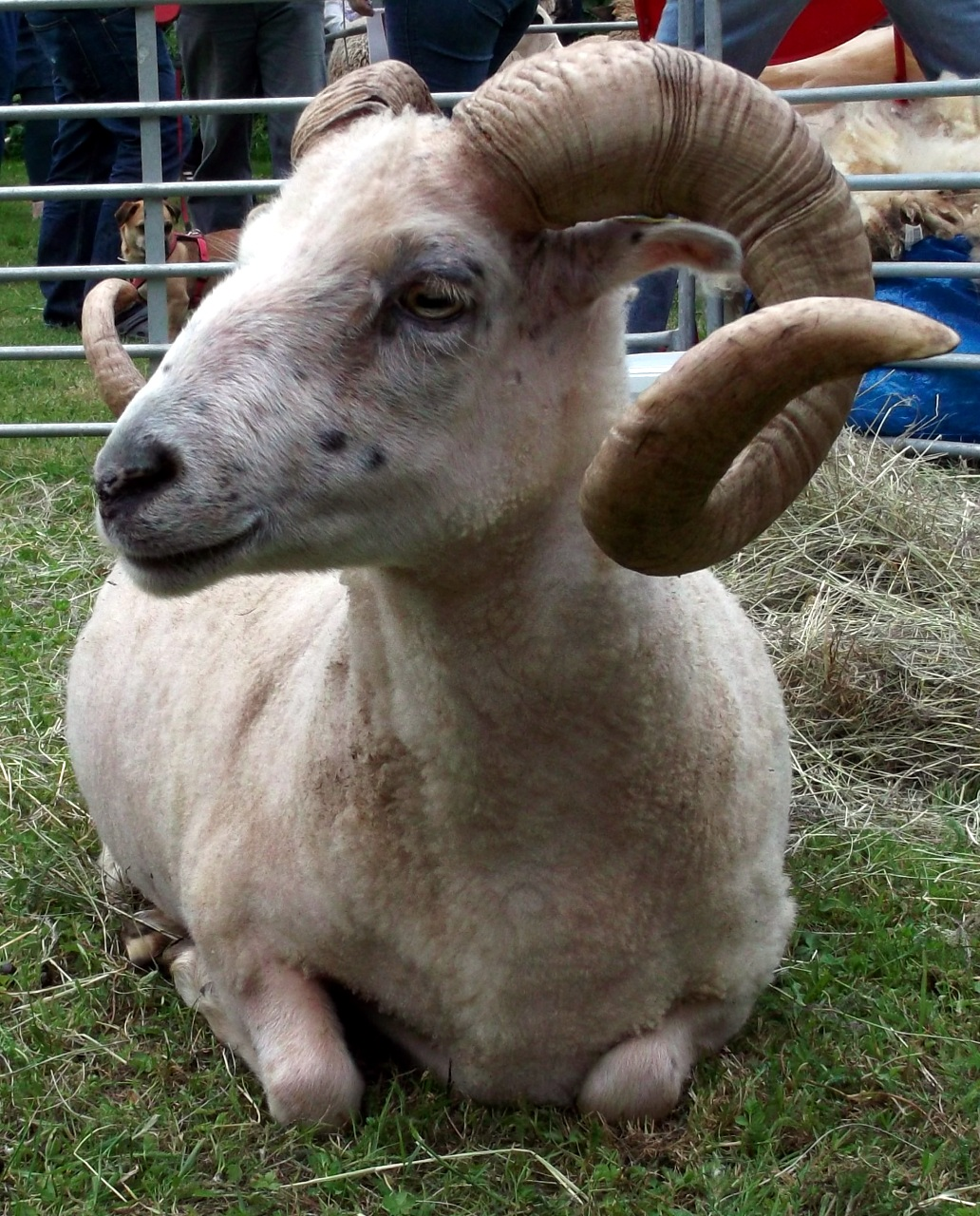
- Other names: Skudden
- Country of origin: Estonia, Germany, Latvia, Lithuania, Switzerland
- Use: Landscape grazing, felting, meat

Traits
- Weight: Male: 35 kg (77 lb) to 50 kg (110 lb); Female: 24 kg (53 lb) to 40 kg (88 lb)
- Wool color: White, brown, black or grey
- Horn status: Large spiral horns in males; females may be polled (hornless)

The Skudde (also, East Prussian Skudde, German: Ostpreußische Skudde) is a breed of domesticated sheep from Estonia, Germany, Latvia, Lithuania, and Switzerland.

== Characteristics ==
Adult rams weigh between 35 kg (77 lb) and 50 kg (110 lb). Adult ewes weigh 25 kg (55 lb) to 40 kg (88 lb). The wool is white, brown, black and gray. It has fine wool fibers, dispersed with short and course fiber. Lambs typically will have dark red or rust colored markings on their nape of their neck and legs.
