= Knud Knudsen (photographer) =

Norwegian photographer

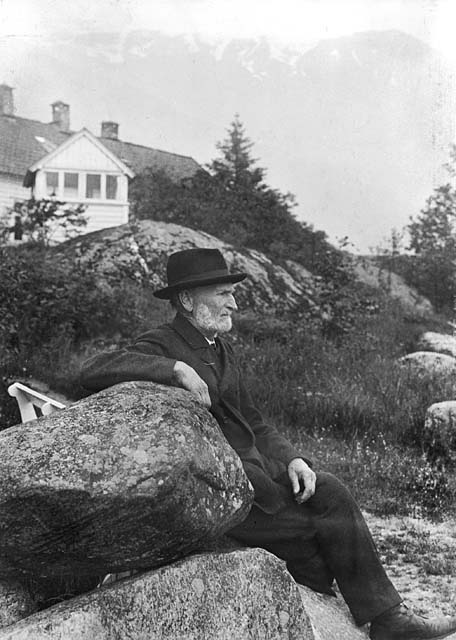
- Knud Knudsen ca. 1900
- Born: 3 January 1832; Odda Municipality, Norway
- Died: 21 May 1915 (aged 83); Norway

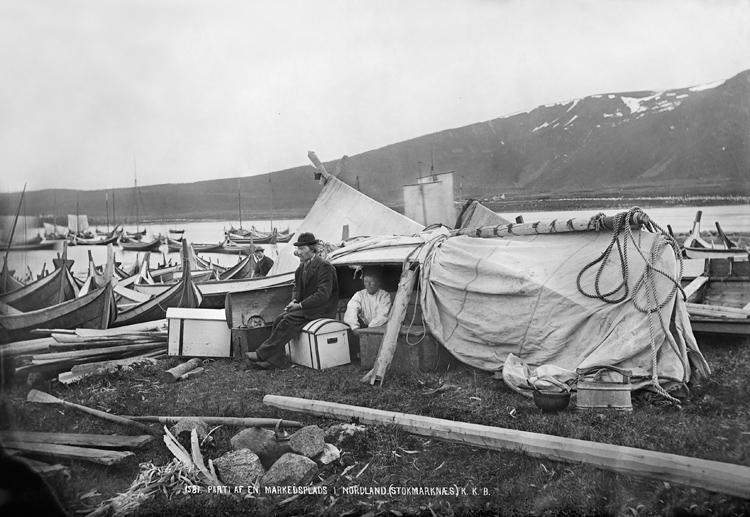
Part of a fair in Nordland County, Norway 1875/1876

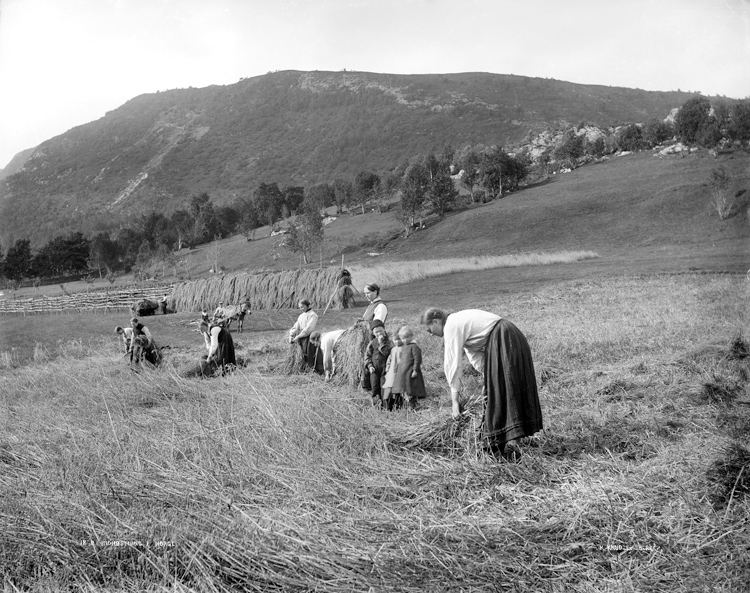
Harvesting of grain in Sunnmøre county, Norway 1888/1894

Knud Knudsen (3 January 1832 – 21 May 1915) was one of Norway's first professional photographers and a pioneer within Norwegian photography. His work includes images from most of Norway in his time and documents much of Norwegian history and ethnology in his photography career 1862–1900.

Knudsen was born in Odda, the son of a merchant who was also a pomologist. His professional career started as a retail clerk in Bergen, and in 1862 he traveled to Reutlingen to study pomology. He returned with an enthusiasm for photography the year after and opened his photography business in Bergen 1864.

He left a collection of 13.500 wet and dry plate negatives, and about 20.000 of albumin silver prints. The negative and print collection are at The Picture Collection, University of Bergen Library.

== Bibliography ==
- Walker Art Center, Friedman, Martin: The Frozen Image. Scandinavian photography. 1982
- Naomi Rosenblum: A World History of Photography. 1984
- Å.Digranes, S.Greve og O.Reiakvam:Det norske bildet. Knud Knudsens fotografier 1864–1900 1988
- N.Morgenstern: Fotograf Knud Knudsen. Bilder fra en nylig oppdaget samling. 1989
- O.Reiakvam, Bilderøyndom, røyndomsbilde: fotografi som kulturelle tidsuttrykk 1997
- Heimatmuseum Reutlingen: Reise nach Reutlingen 1862. Stereoskopbilder des nerwegischen fotograafen Knud Knudsen. 1997
- Roger Erlandsen: Pas nu paa!: Nu tar jeg fra Huldet! Om fotografiets første hundre år i Norge - 1839-1940 2000
- Larsen, Peter og Lien, Sigrid: Norsk Fotohistorie. Fra daguerrotypi til digitalisering. 2007
- Ekeberg, Jonas og Østgaard Lund, Harald (red): 80 millioner bilder. Norsk Kulturhistorisk fotografi 1855–2005. 2008
