= Kåre Kivijärvi =

Norwegian photographer (1938–1991)

Kåre Kivijärvi (born 23 April 1938 in Hammerfest - 20 November 1991) was a Norwegian photographer known for his photojournalistic work in Northern Norway.

Kivijärvi was born into a Kven family and always professed a connection to his ethnic heritage and to Finland. After working as a photographer's apprentice in Finnmark Dagblad, he was in 1959 accepted at Folkwangschule für Gestaltung in Essen, Germany, where he studied with Otto Steinert. After having served in the Royal Norwegian Air Force as an aerial photographer, he accepted a position as staff photographer for Helsingin Sanomat's weekly newsmagazine Viikkosanomat, which brought him on assignment to Greenland, the Soviet Union, Afghanistan, India, and Nepal.

Kivijärvi's work was the first to be accepted by the main annual art exhibition in Norway, the Autumn Exhibition (Høstutstillingen). In this respect, it can be said that he contributed to establish photography as a distinct art form in Norway.

Kivijärvi's photographic style is noted for its stark, sparse imagery. His photo essay on Laestadians in Northern Norway in 1962 is a noted example of this style, as are his depiction of desolate landscapes and harsh climates.

There have been posthumous exhibitions, including one which started in June 2023 in Vadsø's Ruija kvenmuseu (a museum).
