= Scanpix =

Scandinavian stock photography agency

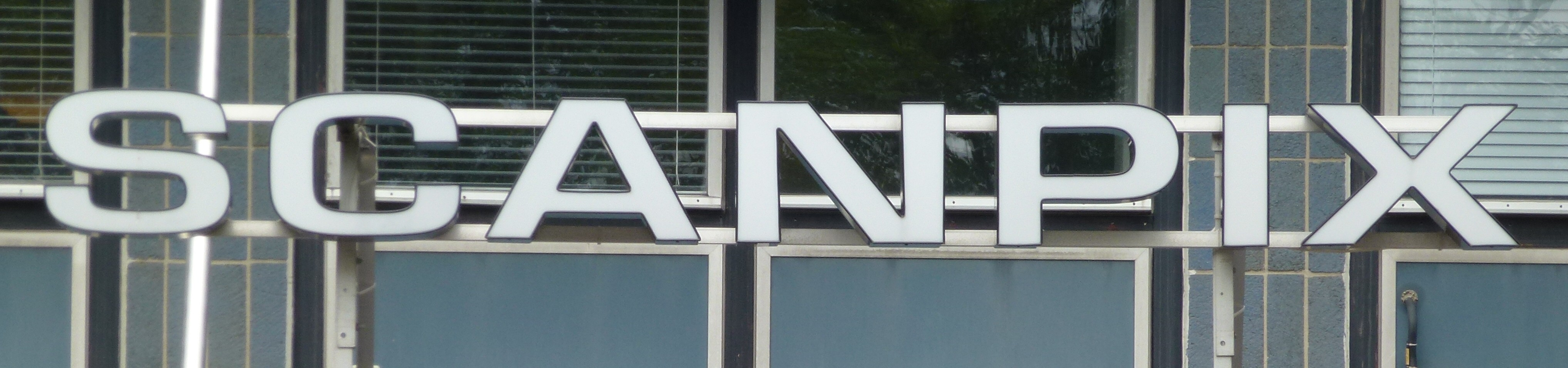
Scanpix sign in Stockholm, Sweden

Scanpix Scandinavia is a stock photography agency. It is the leading distributor of photographic services in Scandinavia, and has independent branches in Denmark, Norway, Sweden and Estonia. Scanpix provides daily news services to subscribing newspapers. Its other customers includes magazines, advertising agencies and publishing houses. Among other company operations, Scanpix archives over 12 million photographs digitally and millions more physically.

Scanpix was founded after a merger between Scan-Foto and the photographic department of NTB Pluss in 1999.

== Norway ==
Scanpix Norway has 48 employees, including 12 photographers. They also sell photographs on behalf of over 80 different agencies, including Associated Press, Reuters and Agence France-Presse. Scanpix Norway is owned by NTB and Schibsted. In 2006, they had a revenue close to 100 million Norwegian kroner.

== Sweden ==
Scanpix Sweden has 50 employees, including photographers. In 2006 they had a revenue of 110 million Swedish kronor and is owned by Bonnier, Schibsted and TT.

== Denmark ==
Scanpix Denmark is owned by the Danish newspaper Berlingske Tidende. They have the largest archive of historical photographs in Denmark, counting over 20 million photographs.
