= Hans Seeberg =

Norwegian marketing agent (1904–1984)

- Born: November 18, 1904
- Died: October 17, 1984 (aged 79)
- Occupation: Marketing agent

Hans Seeberg (November 18, 1904 – October 17, 1984) was a Norwegian marketing agent.

Seeberg spent much of his career as the CEO of the advertising agency Thau Reklamebyrå. After stepping down from that role in 1958, he co-founded the Institute of Marketing, modelled on the English Institute of Practitioners in Advertising, and owned by the Association of Advertising Agencies. In 1989, the institute was incorporated into the Norwegian School of Marketing (Norges Markedshøyskole), which was in turn affiliated with the BI Norwegian Business School.
