= Seeburg, Brandenburg =

Seeburg
- Ortsteil of Dallgow-Döberitz
- Interactive map of Seeburg
- Location within Germany Location within Brandenburg
- Coordinates: 52°30′32″N 13°07′11″E
- Country: Germany
- State: Brandenburg
- District: Havelland
- Municipality: Dallgow-Döberitz
- Elevation: 39 m (128 ft)

Population (2010)
  - Total: 1,164
- Time zone: UTC+01:00 (CET)
  - Summer (DST): UTC+02:00 (CEST)
- Postal codes: 14624
- Dialling codes: 033201
- Vehicle registration: HVL
- Website: Official website

Seeburg (German pronunciation: [ˈzeːbʊʁk]) is a village in the district of in Brandenburg, Germany. Since 2003 Seeburg is part of the municipality of Dallgow-Döberitz.

== Overview ==
Seeburg was first mentioned in 1283. In 1375 the whole village belonged to the cloisters in nearby Spandau. In 1945 it became part of the Soviet Zone of Occupation. Since its territory stretched to the Havel river it cut through the main access roads to the RAF Gatow airfield. This so-called Seeburger Zipfel, comprising Weinmeisterhöhe and part of Groß Glienicke, was part of an exchange of territory between the British and the Soviets involving West-Staaken. On August 30, 1945 Seeburg with a population of ca. 1350 became part of West-Berlin. Tiefwerder Meadows, located on the left bank of the Havel, were not part of this deal and remained off limits until unification in 1990.

Seeburg church was first mentioned in 1180, making it the oldest fieldstone church in Brandenburg.
