= Wustermark =

- Municipality
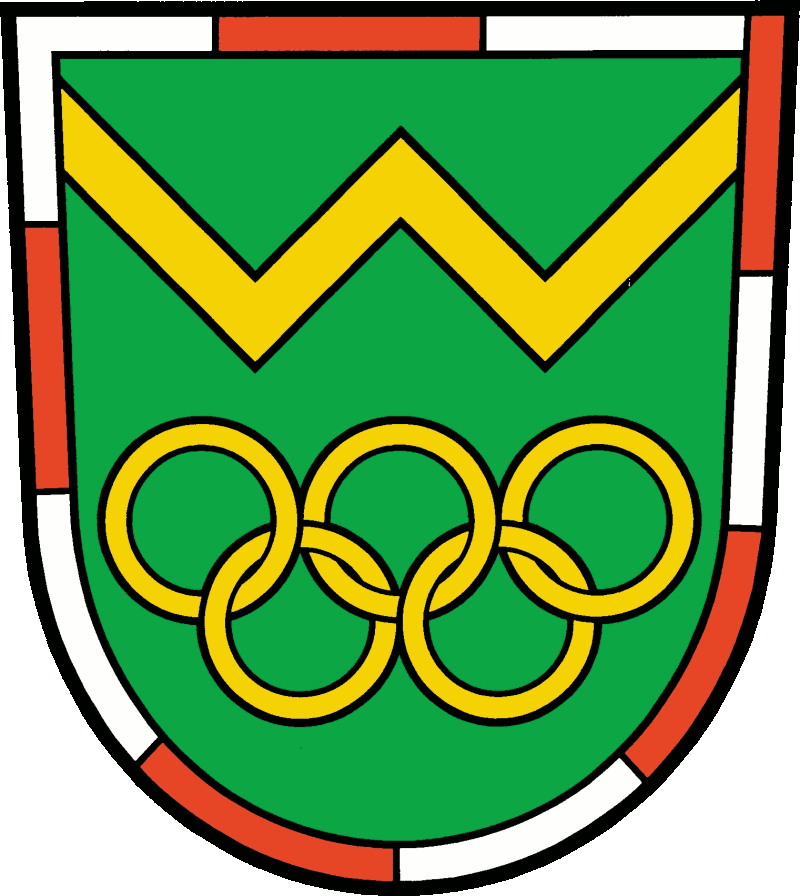
- Coat of arms

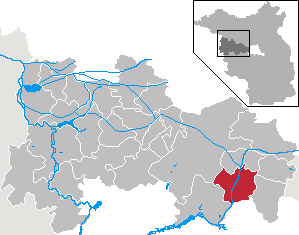
- Location of Wustermark within Havelland district
- Interactive map of Wustermark
- Location within Germany Location within Brandenburg
- Coordinates: 52°33′N 12°57′E
- Country: Germany
- State: Brandenburg
- District: Havelland

Government
  - Mayor (2018–26): Holger Schreiber (Ind.)

Area
  - Total: 52.63 km^{2} (20.32 sq mi)
- Elevation: 35 m (115 ft)

Population (2025-12-31)
  - Total: 11,059
  - Density: 210.1/km^{2} (544.2/sq mi)
- Time zone: UTC+01:00 (CET)
  - Summer (DST): UTC+02:00 (CEST)
- Postal codes: 14641
- Dialling codes: 033234
- Vehicle registration: HVL
- Website: www.wustermark.de

Wustermark is a municipality of the Havelland district, in Brandenburg, Germany.

== History ==
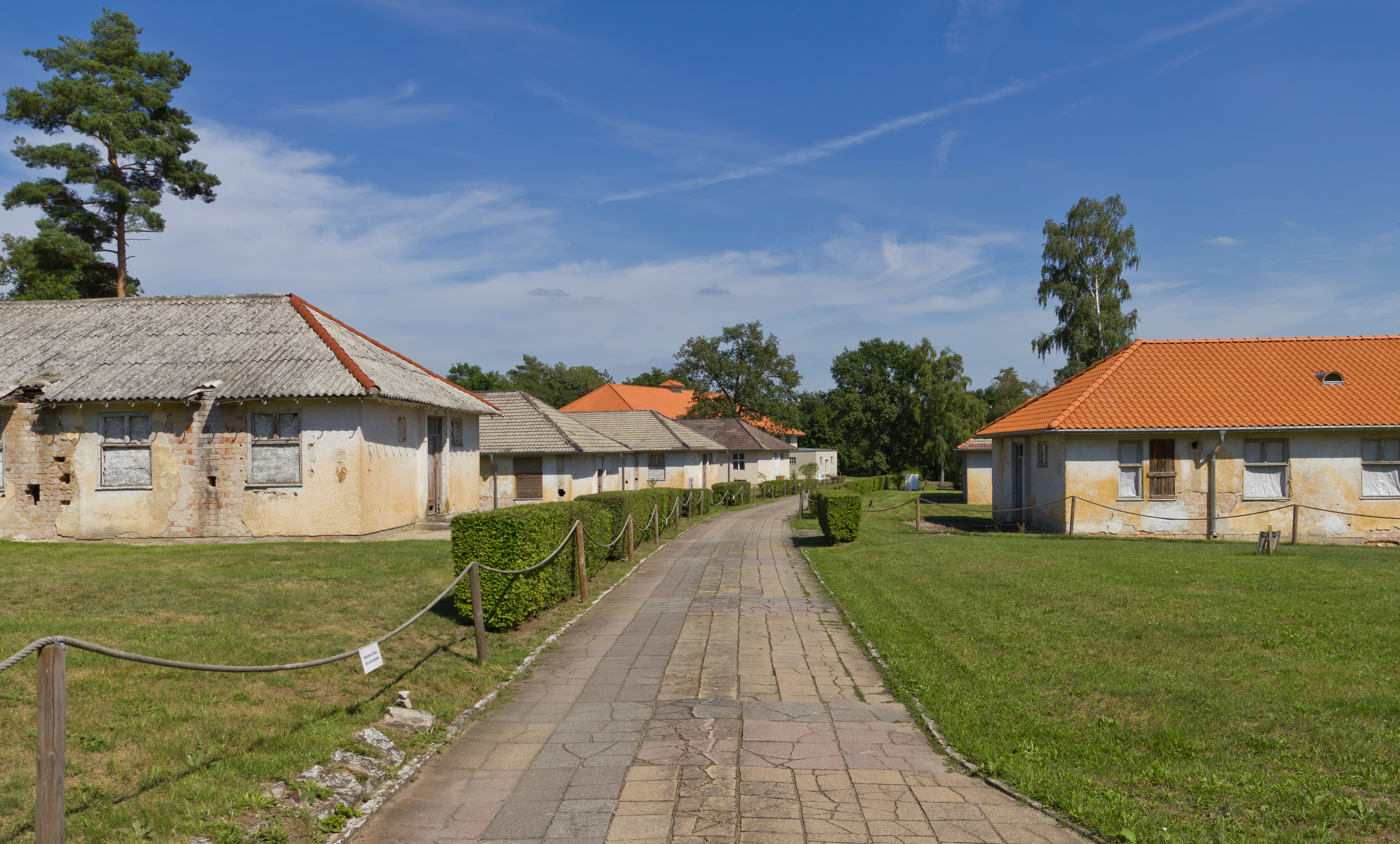
The Olympic Village in Elstal

It was established in 2002 through a merger of the five villages: Buchow-Karpzow, Elstal, Hoppenrade, Priort, and Wustermark. Elstal was the host of the Olympic Village at the 1936 Summer Olympics in Berlin.

== See also ==
- List of Olympic Villages
