= The Heinz Sielmann Foundation =

Non-profit organization in Germany

- Founded: June 2, 1994 in Duderstadt, Lower Saxony
- Founder: Inge and Heinz Sielmann
- Founded at: Duderstadt, Lower Saxony
- Type: Charitable organization
- Region served: Germany
- Key people: Fritz Brickwedde; Michael Beier
- Website: www.sielmann-stiftung.de

The Heinz Sielmann Foundation (de:Heinz Sielmann Stiftung) is a charitable organization based in Duderstadt, Germany. The organization has the official motto "Diversity is our nature" and it introduces people, especially children and young people, to a positive approach towards nature through its programs involving interpersonal experiences. It also spreads public awareness about nature and its need for protection and carries out the preservation of the Heinz Sielmann archive of nature photographs/films.

== History ==
The organization started its journey in 1996 at a property located at Herbigshagen, near the town of Eichsfeld, Duderstadt in Lower Saxony. It acquired the property in 2003. From the early days, the organizations imparts lessons to the school students in the State of Lower Saxony, working as the Regional Environmental Education Center. Its nature adventure house was reopened in 2019 where the exhibition "Diversity needs diversity" exhibited the visitors, the complex interrelationships of nature with the help of mosaic flaps and a media installation. A separate exhibition has been arranged under the title "Heinz Sielmann: A life in a film". The classics and awards of Heinz Sielmann are shown in a separate trophy room. On the northern part of the estate is the Franz von Assisi chapel, in which the urn of the foundation's founder Heinz Sielmann was buried in 2006 and his wife Inge in 2019.

== Functions and activities ==
While working on charitable purposes, the foundation operates and supports a large number of biotope and animal sanctuary projects throughout Germany. It also acquires large landscapes in order to preserve them for nature conservation and to ensure the stability of biodiversity at the site. To protect nature and the environment, in particular to maintain the diversity of fauna and flora, the foundation also acts as a funding institution. It supports projects outside of government programs in Germany. Where the project subject is directly related to nature and environmental issues, the Foundation in individual cases also consider supporting projects outside Germany. The foundation confers four awards, namely Heinz Sielmann Honorary Prize, German Biodiversity Award, Heinz Sielmann Film Prize, and Heinz Sielmann Jugendfilmpreis, primarily to individuals who have taken extraordinary initiatives to protect biodiversity and ecological issues.
