= Berlin/Brandenburg Metropolitan Region =

Berlin/Brandenburg Metropolitan Region Metropolregion Berlin-Brandenburg
- Urban area
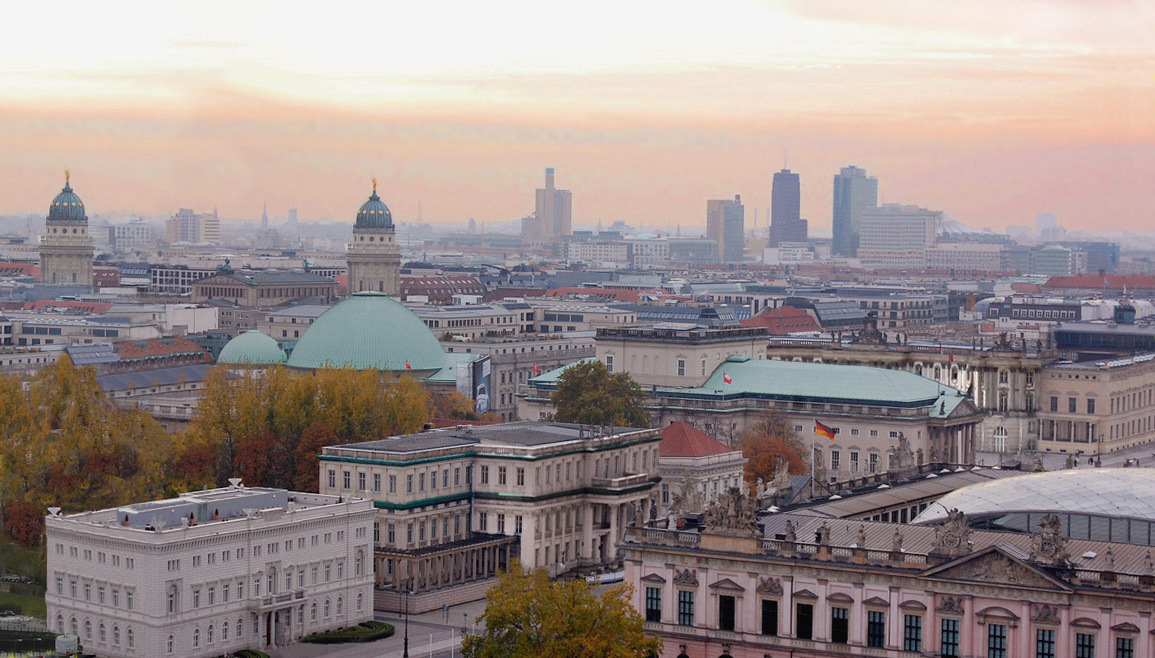
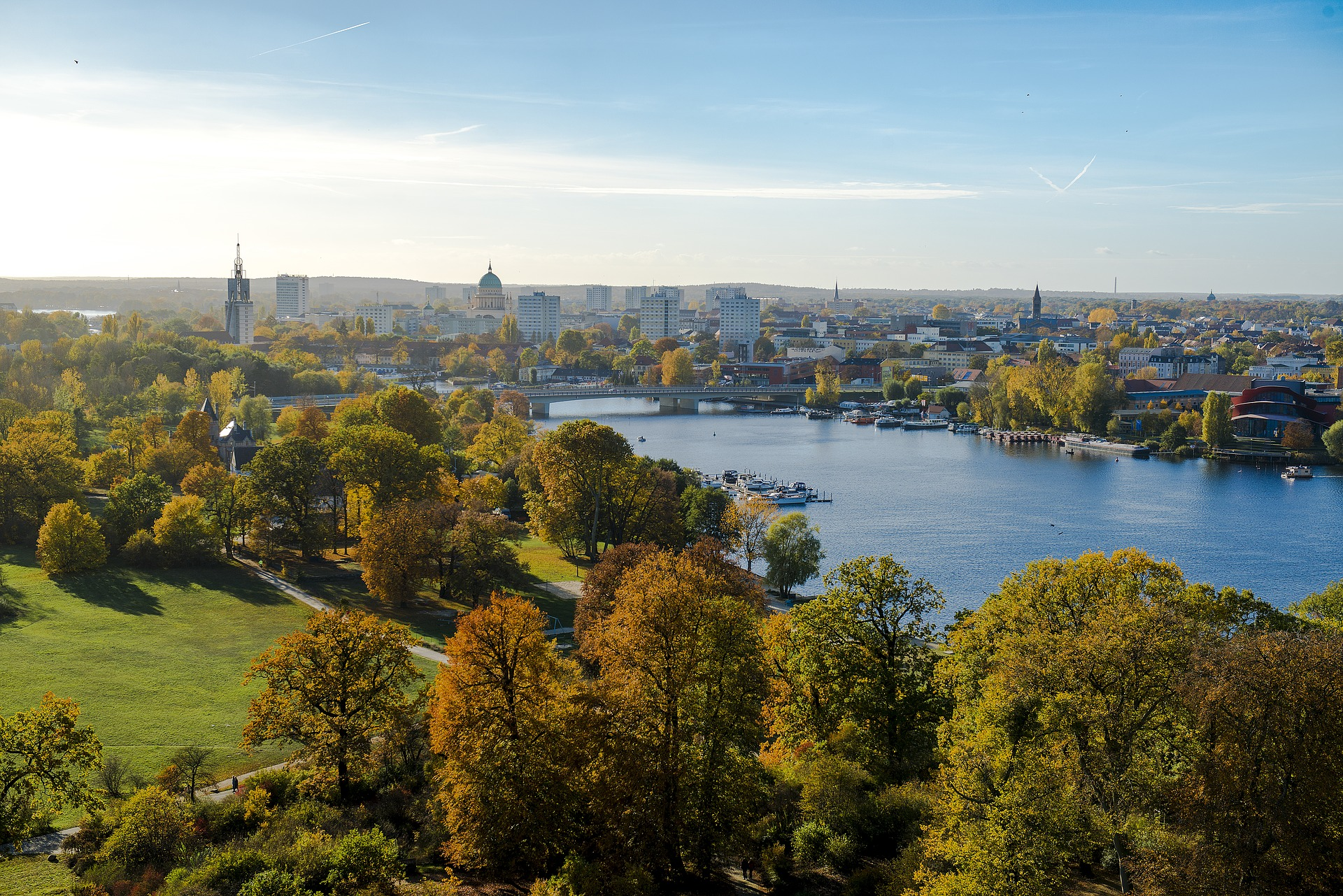
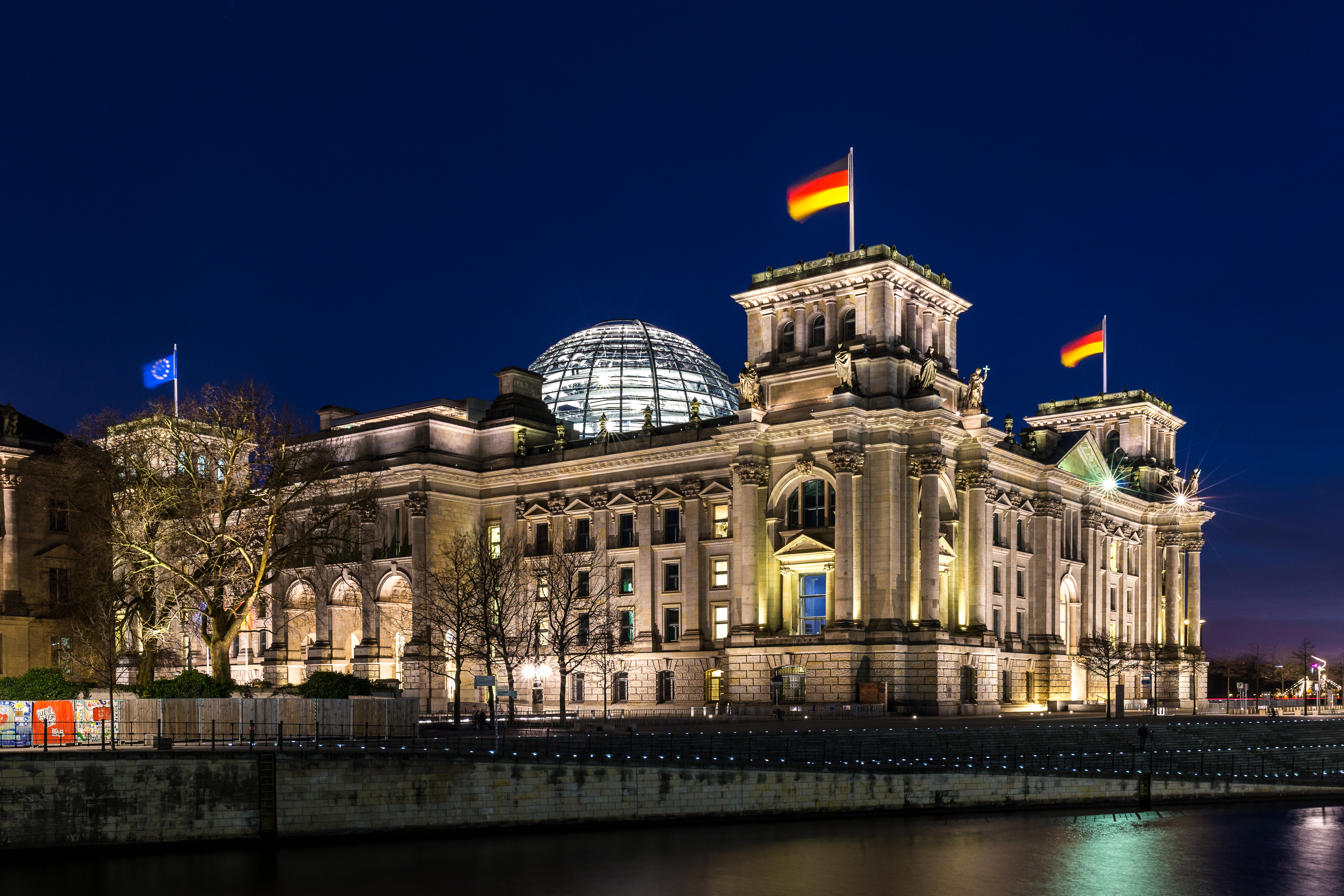
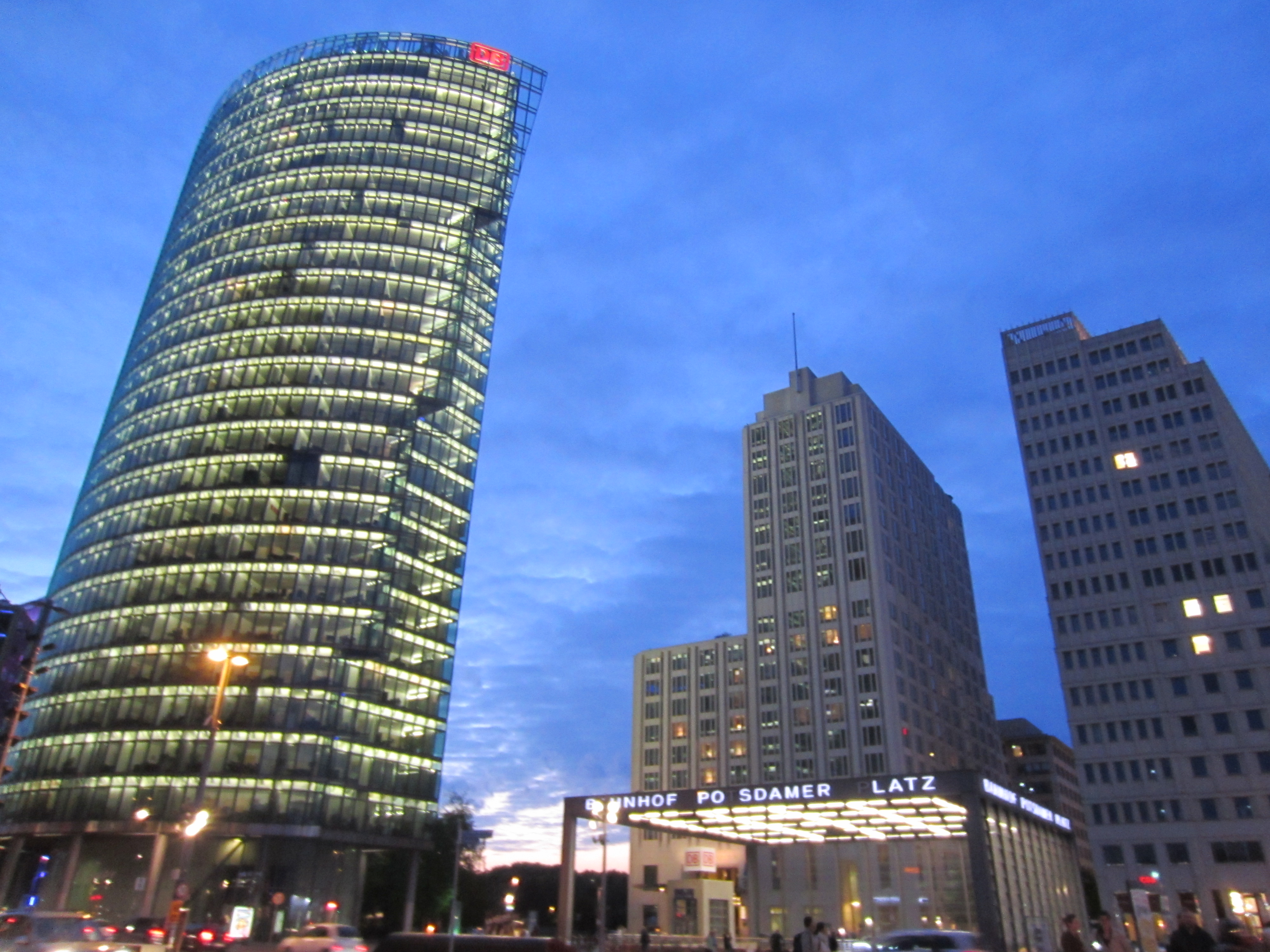
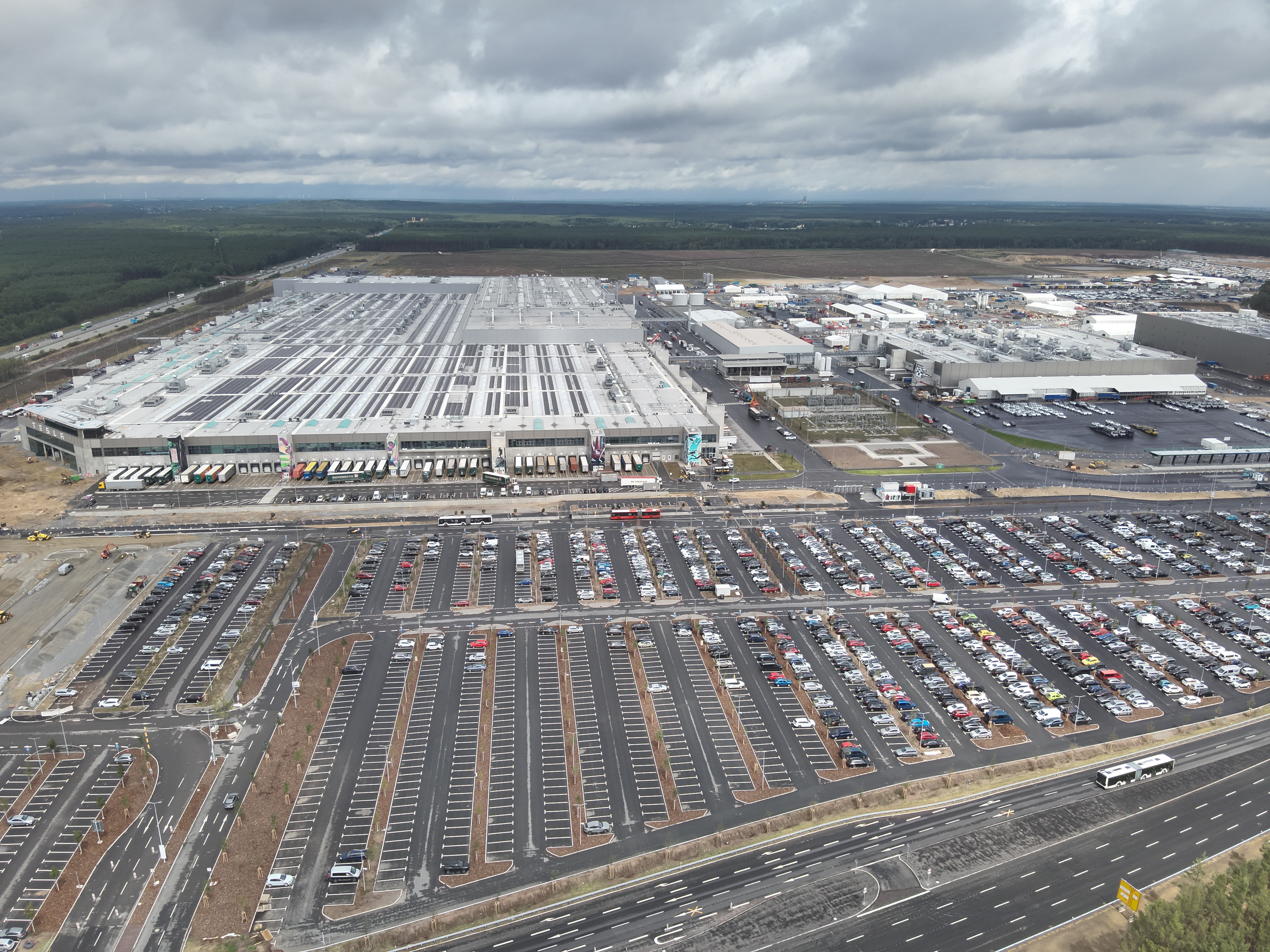
- From top, left to right: Skyline of Berlin, the largest city in the metropolitan area, Potsdam, the capital of Brandenburg, Reichstag building, seat of the German parliament, seat of Deutsche Bahn, the largest railway company in the world and Gigafactory Berlin-Brandenburg

- Berlin/Brandenburg Metropolitan Region
- Country: Germany
- States: Berlin; Brandenburg
- Largest cities: Berlin; Potsdam; Cottbus
- Airports: Berlin Brandenburg Airport

Area
  - Metro: 30,370 km^{2} (11,730 sq mi)

Population (2024)
  - Metro: 6,216,845
  - Metro density: 204.7/km^{2} (530.2/sq mi)

GDP
  - Metro: €304.598 billion (2024)
- Time zone: UTC+1 (CET)
- Website: Official website

The Berlin/Brandenburg metropolitan region (German: Metropolregion Berlin-Brandenburg) or capital region (Hauptstadtregion Berlin-Brandenburg) is one of eleven metropolitan regions of Germany, consisting of the entire territories of the state of Berlin and the surrounding state of Brandenburg. The region covers an area of 30,545 square kilometres (11,793 mi^{2}) with a total population of about 6.2 million.

The metropolitan region should be distinguished from Berlin's immediate agglomeration, dubbed Berliner Umland (English: Berlin's surrounding countryside or Berlin's countryside) which comprises the city and the nearby Brandenburg municipalities. Berliner Umland is significantly smaller and much more densely populated than the metropolitan region, accounting for the vast majority of the region's population over a fraction of its total land area.

== Economy ==
In 2024, Berlin/Brandenburg Metropolitan Region had GDP of around €304.6 billion or 7% of total German GDP.

State	GDP (billion €)
Berlin	207.058
Brandenburg	97.540
Berlin/Brandenburg; Metropolitan Region	304.598

== Geography ==
Within the metropolitan region, there is a much smaller and much more densely populated area called Berliner Umland (English: Berlin's surrounding countryside or Berlin's countryside), which comprises the city of Berlin and the immediate Brandenburg municipalities surrounding it. With over 4.46 million people living in its 3,743 km^{2} (1,445 sq mi) area, Berliner Umland accounts for the vast majority (approximately 74%) of the population of the entire metropolitan region over approximately 12% of the entire area. The region contains five independent cities – of which the Brandenburg capital Potsdam is the only one with a population greater than 100,000 – and 14 districts (Landkreise). The inhabitants of Berlin and Potsdam account for more than 80 percent of the region's total population. The Brandenburg area is characterized by suburban settlements on the Berlin city limits and small towns in the rural outer area.

Beside Berlin and Potsdam, Berliner Umland comprises the following 67 municipalities: These other communes are listed below, subdivided per district. The municipalities marked with ^{(c)} have city status:

- Barnim: Ahrensfelde, Bernau^{(c)}, Panketal, Rüdnitz, Wandlitz, Werneuchen^{(c)}.
- Dahme-Spreewald: Bestensee, Eichwalde, Heidesee, Königs Wusterhausen^{(c)}, Mittenwalde^{(c)}, Schönefeld, Schulzendorf, Wildau, Zeuthen.
- Havelland: Brieselang, Dallgow-Döberitz, Falkensee^{(c)}, Ketzin^{(c)}, Nauen^{(c)}, Paulinenaue, Pessin, Retzow, Schönwalde-Glien, Wustermark.
- Märkisch-Oderland: Altlandsberg^{(c)}, Fredersdorf-Vogelsdorf, Hoppegarten, Neuenhagen, Petershagen-Eggersdorf, Rüdersdorf, Strausberg^{(c)}.
- Oberhavel: Birkenwerder, Glienicke/Nordbahn, Hennigsdorf^{(c)}, Hohen Neuendorf^{(c)}, Kremmen^{(c)}, Leegebruch, Mühlenbecker Land, Oranienburg^{(c)}, Velten.
- Oder-Spree: Erkner^{(c)}, Fürstenwalde^{(c)}, Gosen-Neu Zittau, Grünheide, Langewahl, Rauen, Schöneiche, Spreenhagen, Woltersdorf
- Potsdam-Mittelmark: Beelitz^{(c)}, Borkheide, Groß Kreutz, Kleinmachnow, Michendorf, Nuthetal, Schwielowsee, Seddiner See, Stahnsdorf, Teltow^{(c)}, Werder^{(c)}.
- Teltow-Fläming: Blankenfelde-Mahlow, Großbeeren, Ludwigsfelde^{(c)}, Rangsdorf, Trebbin^{(c)}, Zossen^{(c)}.

== Centralities ==
The metropolitan region counts three levels of centralities (Zentralörtliche Gliederung): The metropolis (Metropole) of Berlin, the four upper level regional centres (Oberzentren) of Potsdam, Cottbus, Brandenburg an der Havel and Frankfurt (Oder), as well as 42 secondary centres (Mittelzentren) allocated to 50 towns.

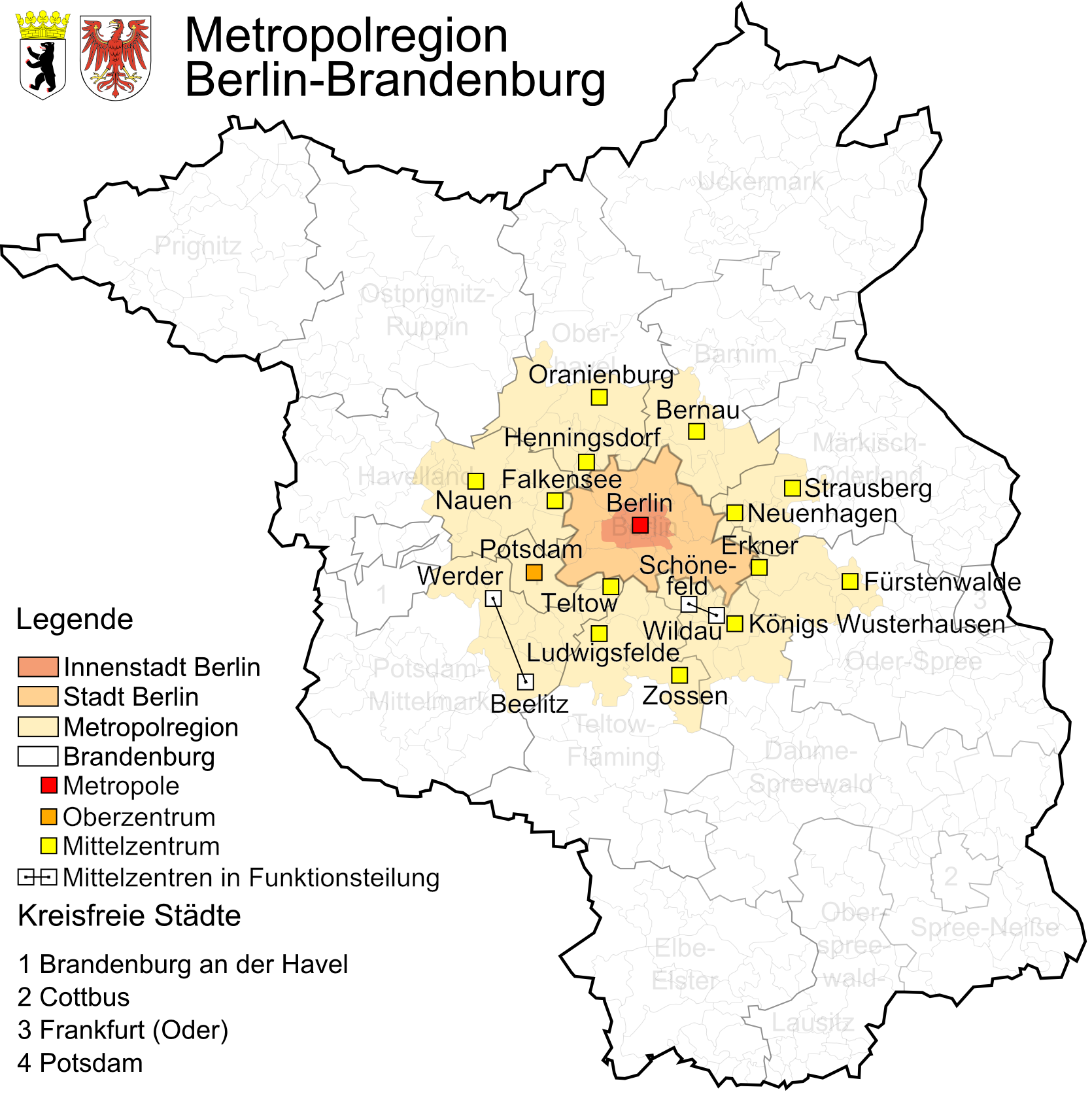
Berlin agglomeration with centralities

Population density in Berlin-Brandenburg in 2015

The Berlin agglomeration comprises the metropolis Berlin, the regional centre of Potsdam and 17 secondary centres:

- Bernau
- Strausberg
- Fürstenwalde
- Königs Wusterhausen
- Ludwigsfelde
- Nauen
- Oranienburg
- Erkner
- Neuenhagen
- Zossen
- Teltow
- Falkensee
- Hennigsdorf
- Wildau and Schönefeld
- Werder and Beelitz
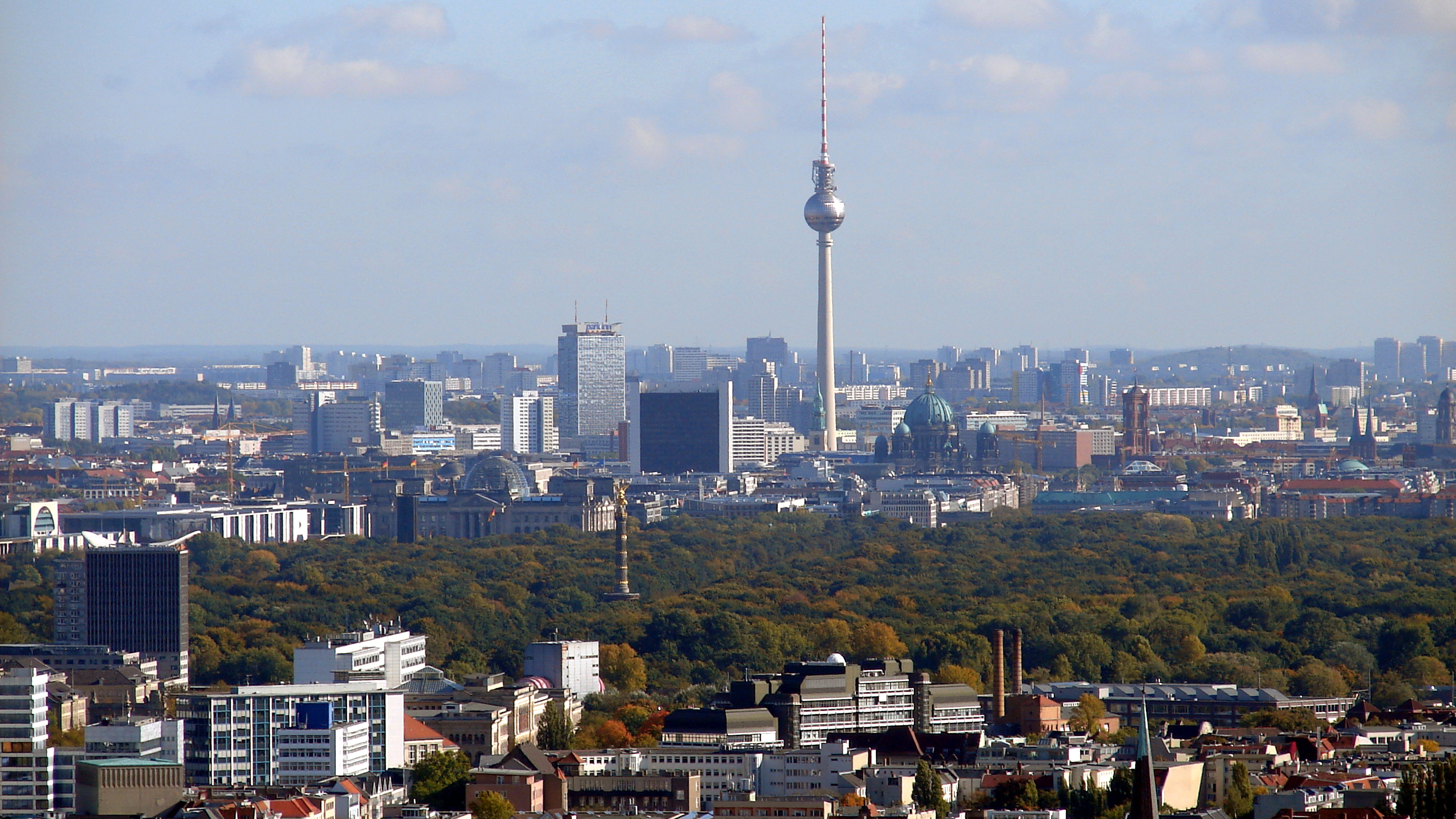
Berlin is the capital of Germany, its biggest city and the most populous city proper in the European Union

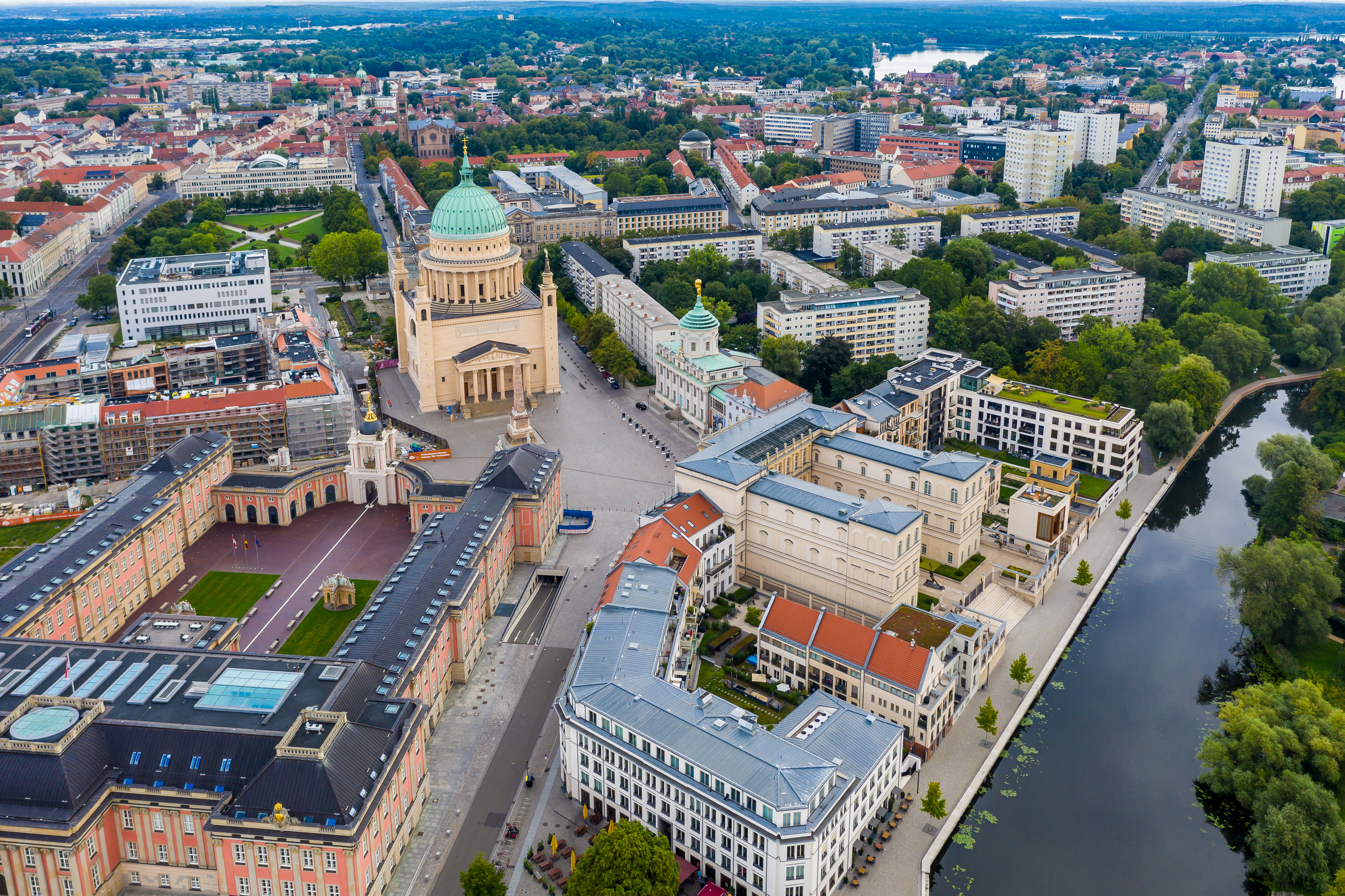
City centre of Potsdam, capital of Brandenburg

== Demographics of Berliner Umland ==
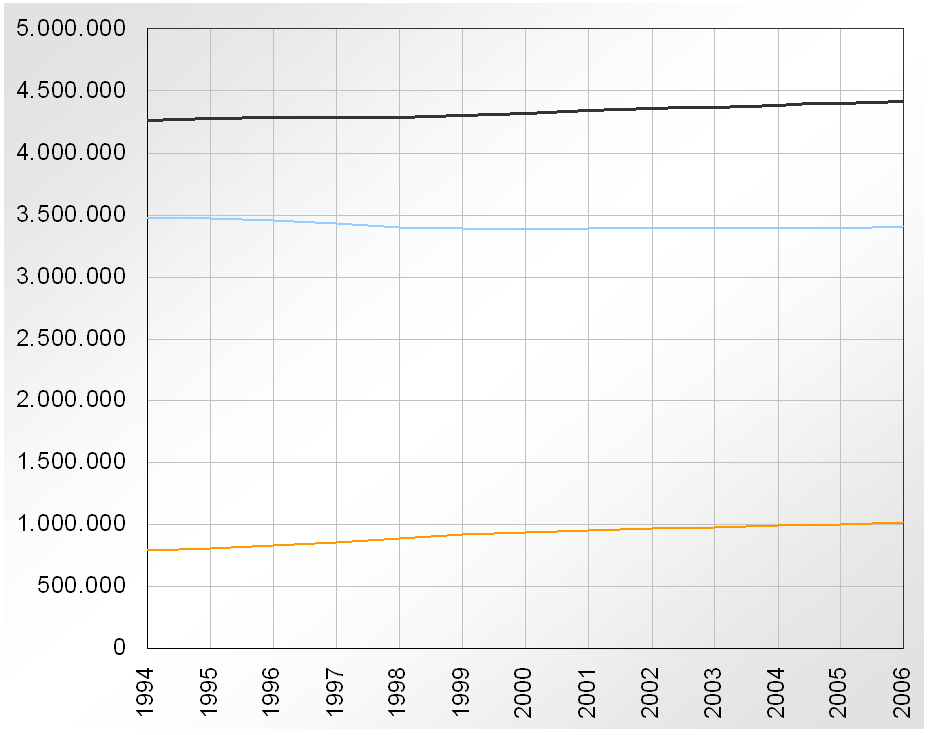
Population of the metropolitan region Berlin/Brandenburg Overall City of Berlin Surrounding Brandenburg municipalities

The following list contains the most populated towns and municipalities in the Berliner Umland:

1. Berlin (3,517,424)
2. Potsdam (161,468)
3. Oranienburg (41,966)
4. Falkensee (40,900)
5. Bernau (36,624)
6. Königs Wusterhausen (34,083)
7. Fürstenwalde (32,456)
8. Strausberg (26,156)
9. Hennigsdorf (25,988)
10. Blankenfelde-Mahlow (25,934)
11. Hohen Neuendorf (24,551)
12. Ludwigsfelde (24,150)
13. Werder (23,211)
14. Teltow (23,069)
15. Wandlitz (21,801)
16. Kleinmachnow (20,181)
17. Panketal (19,291)
18. Zossen (17,717)
19. Neuenhagen (16,972)
20. Hoppegarten (16,808)
21. Nauen (16,804)
22. Rüdersdorf (15,317)

== Transport ==
=== Air ===
The region was served by Berlin Schönefeld Airport. It was the largest airport in Brandenburg. After the airport closed in 2020, it was the second largest international airport of the Berlin-Brandenburg metropolitan region and was located 18 km (11 mi) southeast of central Berlin in Schönefeld. The airport was a base for Condor, easyJet and Ryanair. In 2016, Schönefeld handled 11,652,922 passengers (an increase of 36.7%).

Schönefeld's existing infrastructure and terminals were incorporated into the new Berlin Brandenburg Airport. The airport has become the third busiest airport in Germany after Frankfurt Airport and Munich Airport, surpassing Düsseldorf Airport and making it the twenty-fourth busiest in Europe.

== See also ==
- Fusion of Berlin and Brandenburg
- Metropolitan regions in Germany
