= Tremmen =

- Ortsteil of Ketzin
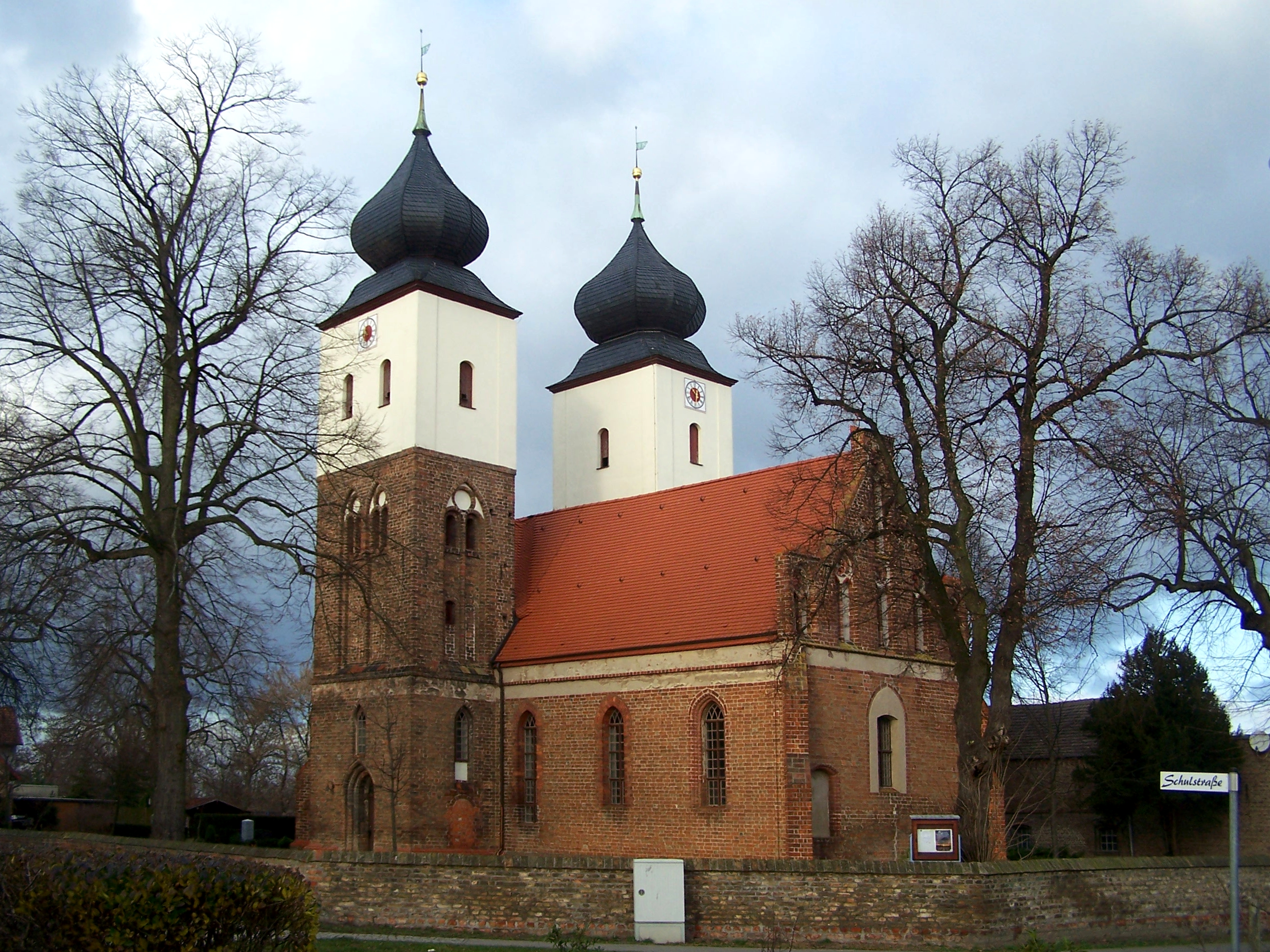
- Tremmen Church
- Interactive map of Tremmen
- Location within Germany Location within Brandenburg
- Coordinates: 52°31′42″N 12°49′3″E
- Country: Germany
- State: Brandenburg
- District: Havelland
- Municipality: Ketzin
- Elevation: 32 m (105 ft)

Population (2011)
  - Total: 720
- Demonym: Tremmener
- Time zone: UTC+01:00 (CET)
  - Summer (DST): UTC+02:00 (CEST)
- Postal codes: 14669
- Dialling codes: 033233
- Vehicle registration: HVL
- Website: Official website

Tremmen is a village in Brandenburg, Germany, situated in the district of Havelland. It is one of the civil parishes (Ortsteile) of the town of Ketzin.

== History ==
The village was founded in 1161 with the name of Tremene. Until October 26, 2003, when it was merged into Ketzin, it was an autonomous municipality.

The local Gothic brick church, St. Marien-Kirche, dates back to 1417 and historically served as a pilgrimage site.

== Geography ==
Tremmen is situated in the geographical region of Nauener Platte, not too far from the western borders of Berlin and its metropolitan region and by the road linking Wustermark and Brandenburg an der Havel. It lies 6 km from Ketzin, 5 from Wustermark, 15 from Nauen, 20 from Potsdam and circa 30 from Rathenow.
