= Reinhold Hoffmann =

German Luftwaffe pilot (1921–1944)

- Born: 9 August 1921; Petersdorf, Germany
- Died: 24 May 1944 (aged 22); Friesack, Germany
- Military career
- Allegiance: Nazi Germany
- Branch: Luftwaffe
- Service years: ?–1944
- Rank: Leutnant (second lieutenant)
- Unit: JG 54
- Conflicts: World War II: Eastern Front; Defense of the Reich
- Awards: Knight's Cross of the Iron Cross

Reinhold Hoffmann (9 August 1921 – 24 May 1944) was a Luftwaffe ace and recipient of the Knight's Cross of the Iron Cross during World War II. The Knight's Cross of the Iron Cross, and its variants were the highest awards in the military and paramilitary forces of Nazi Germany during World War II. On 24 May 1944, Hoffmann attempted an emergency landing at Friesack following aerial combat. His Focke-Wulf Fw 190 crashed, killing him instantly. He was posthumously awarded the Knight's Cross on 28 January 1945. Depending on source, he was credited between 61 and 67 aerial victories, at least 58 of which on the Eastern Front.

== Career ==
Hoffmann was born on 9 August 1921 in Petersdorf, now Piechowice in southwestern Poland, then in Province of Lower Silesia within the Weimar Republic.

On 24 May 1944, Hoffmann was killed in action flying Focke-Wulf Fw 190 A-8 (Werknummer 680184—factory number), crashing 3 kilometers (1.9 miles) west of Friesack. His aircraft somersaulted during the emergency landing. Posthumously, he was awarded the Knight's Cross of the Iron Cross (Ritterkreuz des Eisernen Kreuzes) on 28 January 1945.

== Summary of career ==
=== Aerial victory claims ===
According to US historian David T. Zabecki, Hoffmann was credited with 67 aerial victories. Spick lists him with 66 aerial victories, 60 on the Eastern Front and six heavy bombers on the Western Front, claimed in an unknown number of combat missions. Mathews and Foreman, authors of Luftwaffe Aces — Biographies and Victory Claims, researched the German Federal Archives and found documentation for 67 aerial victory claims. This number includes 64 claims on the Eastern Front and three heavy bombers on the Western Front.

Victory claims were logged to a map-reference (PQ = Planquadrat), for example "PQ 54431". The Luftwaffe grid map (Jägermeldenetz) covered all of Europe, western Russia and North Africa and was composed of rectangles measuring 15 minutes of latitude by 30 minutes of longitude, an area of about 360 square miles (930 km^{2}). These sectors were then subdivided into 36 smaller units to give a location area 3 km × 4 km (1.9 mi × 2.5 mi) in size.

Chronicle of aerial victories
This and the ♠ (Ace of spades) indicates those aerial victories which made Hoffmann an "ace-in-a-day", a term which designates a fighter pilot who has shot down five or more airplanes in a single day. This along with the * (asterisk) indicates an Herausschuss (separation shot)—a severely damaged heavy bomber forced to separate from his combat box which was counted as an aerial victory. This and the ? (question mark) indicates information discrepancies listed by Prien, Stemmer, Rodeike, Bock, Mathews and Foreman.
Claim	Date	Time	Type	Location	Claim	Date	Time	Type	Location
– 5. Staffel of Jagdgeschwader 54 – Eastern Front — July 1942 – 3 February 1943
1? (Note: Mathews and Foreman list this claim as Hoffmann's first aerial victory. Prien, Stemmer, Rodeike and Bock express doubt whether this claim can clearly be attributed to Hoffmann.)	27 July 1942	19:05	Yak-1	southeast of Pola train station	2	22 August 1942	06:11	Il-2	PQ 54431; 20 km (12 mi) southwest of Belyov
– 5. Staffel of Jagdgeschwader 54 – Eastern Front — 4 February – November 1944
3	21 March 1943	08:40	Yak-1	PQ 36 Ost 00272; 15 km (9.3 mi) northeast of Pushkin	27	20 October 1943	15:48	Yak-7	north of Kiev
4	30 May 1943	20:04	P-40	PQ 36 Ost 10122 east of Shlisselburg	? (Note: According to Mathews and Foreman, this claim was filed by Hoffmann. Prien, Stemmer, Rodeike and Bock attribute this claim to Leutnant Rudolf Hofmann.)	14 September 1943	16:07	Il-2	30 km (19 mi) north-northwest of Jarzewo
5	12 July 1943	19:25	LaGG-3	PQ 35 Ost 74754	28♠	21 October 1943	12:09	Yak-7	east of Khodoriv
6	13 July 1943	12:52	Boston	PQ 35 Ost 63254; 40 km (25 mi) east-southeast of Oryol	29♠	21 October 1943	12:15	Yak-9	south of Jaschniki
7	13 July 1943	12:53	Boston	PQ 35 Ost 63291; 55 km (34 mi) southeast of Oryol	30♠	21 October 1943	14:50	La-5	east of Kargalnik
8	13 July 1943	12:56	Boston	PQ 35 Ost 73172	31♠	21 October 1943	15:00	Yak-7	west-southwest of Pii
9	16 July 1943	11:30	Il-2 m.H. (Note: The "m.H." refers to an Ilyushin Il-2 with rear gunner (mit Heckschütze).)	PQ 35 Ost 64853; 20 km (12 mi) southeast of Mtsensk	32♠	21 October 1943	15:03	Il-2	west-southwest of Pii
10	16 July 1943	11:37	Il-2 m.H.	PQ 35 Ost 64894; 25 km (16 mi) southeast of Mtsensk	33♠	21 October 1943	15:04	Il-2	northeast of Pii
11	16 July 1943	11:42	Il-2 m.H.	PQ 35 Ost 74743	34♠	21 October 1943	15:06	Il-2	south of Gruschewo
12	22 July 1943	18:25	Il-2	PQ 35 Ost 63112 vicinity of Oryol	35♠	22 October 1943	06:19	La-5	south of Daljewka south of Lalzka
13	22 July 1943	18:35	LaGG-3	PQ 35 Ost 63162; 20 km (12 mi) southeast of Oryol	36♠	22 October 1943	09:14	Il-2	south-southeast of Kussinoje south-southeast of Kusminzy
14	2 August 1943	09:00	Yak-7	PQ 36 Ost 00262; 10 km (6.2 mi) southwest of Shlisselburg	37♠	22 October 1943	09:15	Il-2	north of Pii
?	2 August 1943	12:58	LaGG-3	30 km (19 mi) west-southwest of Shlisselburg	38♠	22 October 1943	09:17	Il-2	west of Schtschutschinka
15	9 August 1943	16:01	LaGG-3	PQ 35 Ost 54582; 25 km (16 mi) northeast of Karachev	39♠	22 October 1943	09:21	Il-2	east of Rzhyshchiv west of Schtschutschinka
16	9 August 1943	16:02	LaGG-3	PQ 35 Ost 54591; 30 km (19 mi) northeast of Karachev	40♠	22 October 1943	12:08	La-5	east of Romaschki
17	11 August 1943	18:32	LaGG-3	PQ 35 Ost 45762; 5 km (3.1 mi) northeast of Kitov	41♠	22 October 1943	12:11	Yak-7	north of Chodorow
18	17 August 1943	04:50	Il-2	PQ 35 Ost 53253; 20 km (12 mi) southwest of Oryol	42♠	22 October 1943	12:14	Yak-7	north of Chodorow
?	21 August 1943	16:45	Il-2	20 km (12 mi) southwest of Sevsk	43	24 October 1943	12:45	Yak-9	south of Trachtemirow south of Frantimirow
19	23 August 1943	07:11	Boston	PQ 35 Ost 44413; 10 km (6.2 mi) southwest of Zhizdra	44	2 November 1943	15:07	Yak-9	east of Lyutezh
20	23 August 1943	07:14	Boston	PQ 35 Ost 44283; 5 km (3.1 mi) south of Zhizdra	45♠	3 November 1943	09:15	Il-2	east of Glebowka south of Vyshgorod
21	24 August 1943	07:04	DB-3	PQ 35 Ost 44523, west of Stajka; 15 km (9.3 mi) south-southwest of Dyatkovo	46♠	3 November 1943	11:09? (Note: According to Mathews and Foreman claimed at 11:00.)	Yak-7	south of Vyshgorod southeast of Vyshgorod
?	26 August 1943	16:25	Boston	20 km (12 mi) southeast of Sevsk	47♠	3 November 1943	11:13	Yak-9	southeast of Vyshgorod east of Valki
22	1 September 1943	18:01	Il-2 m.H.	PQ 35 Ost 25462; 20 km (12 mi) west of Yelnya	48♠	3 November 1943	12:25	Il-2	east of Valki east-southeast of Lyutezh
23	1 September 1943	18:07	Il-2 m.H.	PQ 35 Ost 35343; 10 km (6.2 mi) southeast of Yelnya	49♠	3 November 1943	12:28	Il-2	east-southeast of Lyutezh west of Vyshgorod
24	6 September 1943	06:00	Yak-9	PQ 35 Ost 26734; 10 km (6.2 mi) northeast of Moschna	50♠	3 November 1943	12:40	Yak-9	west of Vyshgorod east of Glebowka
25	6 September 1943	09:50	Yak-9	PQ 35 Ost 26841; 10 km (6.2 mi) northwest of Yartsevo	51♠	3 November 1943	14:38	Yak-9	west of Valki
?	7 September 1943	17:31	La-5	15 km (9.3 mi) north of Zhizdra	52♠	3 November 1943	14:49	Yak-9	southeast of Lyutezh
26	8 September 1943	11:35	Yak-9	PQ 35 Ost 4416	53	6 November 1943	07:55	Yak-7	south of Lyutezh east of Lyutezh
– 5. Staffel of Jagdgeschwader 54 – Eastern Front — 1 January – April 1944
54	6 April 1944	08:00	Yak-9	PQ 25 Ost 88364; 20 km (12 mi) southwest of Selo	57	17 April 1944	06:55	Il-2	PQ 25 Ost 88883; 40 km (25 mi) southeast of Ostrov
55	8 April 1944	10:00	Yak-9	PQ 25 Ost 88883; 45 km (28 mi) southeast of Ostrov	58	17 April 1944	06:59	Il-2	PQ 25 Ost 88824; 40 km (25 mi) southeast of Ostrov
56	17 April 1944	06:53	Il-2	PQ 25 Ost 88842; 30 km (19 mi) south-southeast of Ostrov	59	21 April 1944	11:23	La-5	PQ 26 Ost 70644; 20 km (12 mi) west-southwest of Hungerburg
– 9. Staffel of Jagdgeschwader 54 – Defense of the Reich — May 1944
60	19 May 1944	13:15	B-24	PQ 15 Ost FB south of Wittingen	62	19 May 1944	13:31? (Note: According to Mathews and Foreman claimed at 13:21.)	B-24*	PQ 15 Ost JB south of Wittingen
61	19 May 1944	13:18	B-24*	PQ 15 Ost FB; Nienburg					

=== Awards ===
- Iron Cross (1939) 2nd and 1st Class
- Honor Goblet of the Luftwaffe on 1 November 1943 as Unteroffizier and pilot (Note: According to Obermaier on 29 September 1943.)
- German Cross in Gold on 14 November 1943 as Feldwebel in the II./Jagdgeschwader 54
- Knight's Cross of the Iron Cross on 28 January 1945 as Leutnant and pilot in the 6./Jagdgeschwader 54 (Note: According to Scherzer as Leutnant of the Reserves and pilot in the III./Jagdgeschwader 54.)
