= Fusion of Berlin and Brandenburg =

Proposed German state unification

The Berlin/Brandenburg Metropolitan Region, with the Berlin agglomeration highlighted in orange.

The idea of unifying the German states of Berlin and Brandenburg has gained particular notoriety since German reunification.

== Background ==
Berlin is wholly surrounded by Brandenburg, which has a large suburban population, dubbed the Speckgürtel (bacon belt). There are over 225,000 residents of Brandenburg who commute to Berlin as of 2020 and the states share a common history, dialect and culture.

The states already cooperate extensively, for example they share one public broadcaster (the rbb), cooperate on judicial matters, transportation (the Berlin Brandenburg Airport and the Verkehrsverbund Berlin-Brandenburg for example) and in the private sector, for example the Gigafactory Berlin-Brandenburg. Both the Senate of Berlin and the Brandenburg state government have agreed to even closer cooperation. The two states have, by 2012, agreed to 27 state contracts and 79 administrative arrangements. Both Berlin and Brandenburg have been dominated by the Social Democratic Party since the early 2000s, though the political culture of urban Berlin in particular is a lot different.

The Social Democratic Party in Brandenburg is thought of as being more centrist, rural and culturally conservative, reflecting the sentiment of the state, in particular outside the Berlin metro. For example, when Social Democratic Party members were asked to vote on the renewed Grand coalition in 2018, opposed by the left-wing of the SPD, especially the Jusos, the SPD in Berlin opposed it as well. The Social Democratic Party in Brandenburg also has historically been very supportive of the lignite mining in the state, something that is universally disapproved of in Berlin.

=== Legal basis ===
The legal basis for a combined state of Berlin and Brandenburg is different from other state fusion proposals. Normally, Article 29 of the Basic Law stipulates that a state fusion requires a federal law. However, a clause added to the Basic Law in 1994, Article 118a, allows Berlin and Brandenburg to unify without federal approval, requiring a referendum and a ratification by both state parliaments.

== 1996 fusion attempt ==
=== State contract ===
After the Bundestag passed Article 118a in 1994, paving the way for unification without federal approval, preparations began for a fusion of the two states by 1996. The Abgeordnetenhaus of Berlin had voted in favour of unifying with Brandenburg in principle back in February 1991. In April 1995, the Senate of Berlin and the Brandenburg state government agreed to a state contract unifying both states. The contract was ratified by the Abgeordnetenhaus of Berlin 188:42 and, a bit more narrowly, 64:24 by the Landtag of Brandenburg with a two-thirds majority each time.

The new state would have been called Berlin-Brandenburg, would have had a population of around 6 million and a GDP of around 180 billion DM. In a major concession, the capital of combined state would have been Potsdam, the capital of Brandenburg. The coat of arms would have been a combination of the coat of arms of Berlin and Brandenburg.

=== Campaign ===
A public referendum was held on 5 May 1996. This has been the first, and to date, only referendum of such sort held in Germany. The fusion received near-unanimous support by a broad coalition of both state governments, political parties, media, business associations, trade unions and churches. The state governments heavily promoted voting in favour of the referendum, which was unsuccessfully challenged in the courts. The Party of Democratic Socialism and the Alliance 90/The Greens in Brandenburg opposed the referendum, as did a lot of local SPD politicians.

=== Results ===
Two questions were asked in the referendum: whether the fusion of the two states should proceed, and whether the fusion should take place in 1999 or 2002.

Results of the referendum by district.

State	Berlin		Brandenburg		Total	
Question 1: Fusion
Yes	765,602	53.60	475,208	36.57	1,240,810	45.49
No	654,840	45.85	814,936	62.72	1,469,776	53.88
Invalid	7,826	0.55	9,280	0.71	17,106	0.63
Question 2: Year of fusion
1999	557,337	39.02	343,764	26.46	901,101	33.04
2002	442,600	30.99	368,714	28.38	811,314	29.74
Invalid	428,331	29.99	586,946	45.17	1,015,277	37.22
Both invalid	4,127	0.29	5,472	0.42	9,599	0.35
Total	1,428,268	100.00	1,299,424	100.00	2,727,692	100.00
Registered/turnout	2,475,724	57.69	1,957,424	66.38	4,433,148	61.53
Source: Statistische Bibliothek

Borough/District	Question 1			Question 2			Turnout
Borough/District	Yes	No	Invalid	1999	2002	Invalid	Turnout
Mitte	43.45	55.98	0.56	32.16	28.36	39.48	55.55
Tiergarten	56.31	43.03	0.66	41.34	31.47	27.18	53.71
Wedding	52.71	46.60	0.69	37.81	32.13	30.06	50.81
Prenzlauer Berg	45.65	53.77	0.58	33.94	29.40	36.66	50.29
Friedrichshain	43.28	56.22	0.50	31.67	28.81	39.52	50.82
Kreuzberg	51.65	47.63	0.72	38.57	32.19	29.24	45.97
Charlottenburg	60.97	38.51	0.52	44.29	31.99	23.73	58.82
Spandau	59.83	39.57	0.60	43.93	31.55	24.52	61.05
Wilmersdorf	62.02	37.42	0.56	44.79	32.11	23.10	61.50
Zehlendorf	67.90	31.67	0.42	48.98	32.35	18.66	70.94
Schöneberg	58.78	40.66	0.56	43.14	32.34	24.52	57.17
Steglitz	62.36	37.10	0.54	44.89	32.61	22.50	65.74
Tempelhof	58.28	41.18	0.53	41.60	33.15	25.24	64.02
Neukölln	54.84	44.58	0.58	39.70	32.34	27.96	56.47
Treptow	48.69	50.79	0.52	36.04	27.64	36.32	58.81
Köpenick	51.29	48.22	0.49	38.94	27.43	33.63	58.39
Lichtenberg	44.26	55.24	0.50	32.30	27.77	39.94	55.41
Weissensee	49.76	49.53	0.71	36.77	27.99	35.24	55.67
Pankow	48.77	50.69	0.54	35.75	28.18	36.07	56.05
Reinickendorf	58.72	40.72	0.56	42.27	32.95	24.78	62.93
Marzahn	39.15	60.35	0.50	28.18	30.22	41.60	54.24
Hohenschönhausen	36.81	62.74	0.45	26.54	29.34	44.12	53.86
Hellersdorf	41.42	58.17	0.41	30.40	29.83	39.77	53.22
West Berlin	58.92	40.51	0.57	42.68	32.36	24.96	59.67
East Berlin	44.58	54.91	0.52	32.80	28.67	38.53	54.62
Berlin	53.60	45.85	0.55	39.02	30.99	29.99	57.69
Brandenburg an der Havel	37.55	61.86	0.59	28.24	28.99	42.77	62.85
Cottbus	37.08	62.41	0.51	27.02	28.38	44.61	63.88
Frankfurt (Oder)	32.39	66.92	0.68	23.79	31.97	44.24	65.39
Potsdam	34.34	65.19	0.47	26.37	30.80	42.83	76.28
Barnim	36.45	62.86	0.69	26.66	28.92	44.43	65.18
Dahme-Spreewald	36.34	62.85	0.81	25.95	28.79	45.26	72.63
Elbe-Elster	37.13	61.99	0.89	25.94	26.04	48.02	59.72
Havelland	38.61	60.75	0.63	28.48	27.87	43.65	67.10
Märkisch-Oderland	36.33	62.95	0.72	26.10	29.18	44.72	68.50
Oberhavel	37.59	61.83	0.58	27.94	27.70	44.35	68.28
Oberspreewald-Lausitz	36.49	62.56	0.95	25.68	27.16	47.16	61.93
Oder-Spree	36.10	63.17	0.73	25.69	29.87	44.45	67.59
Ostprignitz-Ruppin	35.45	63.76	0.79	24.80	26.42	48.78	64.76
Potsdam-Mittelmark	39.50	59.62	0.88	28.51	29.16	42.33	72.89
Prignitz	33.80	65.47	0.73	24.28	26.45	49.27	59.92
Spree-Neiße	34.11	65.20	0.70	23.44	28.01	48.55	62.28
Teltow-Fläming	38.87	60.46	0.66	28.38	27.83	43.79	70.12
Uckermark	36.54	62.70	0.76	26.53	26.55	46.92	59.77
Brandenburg	36.57	62.72	0.71	26.46	28.38	45.17	66.38
Total	45.49	53.88	0.63	33.04	29.74	37.22	61.53

Berlin voters not only approved the fusion 53% in favour to 45% against, the quorum of 25% of eligible voters approving of the measure was also met. However, this was only achieved thanks to the votes of the citizens of West Berlin. Most East Berliners voted against the merger, as did the Brandenburgers. The latter disapproved of the fusion by a large margin, 62 to 36% and the quorum was not met, though barely. The wealthier, more suburban districts of Brandenburg close to former West Berlin such as Potsdam-Mittelmark showed more sympathy for the fusion, though nevertheless, every district of Brandenburg disapproved by a large majority. Similarly, all the boroughs that were formerly West Berlin voted in favour, the boroughs with the largest share of the vote in favour being the wealthier boroughs in southwestern Berlin, and almost all boroughs that were formerly East Berlin voted against the referendum, though the margin was not as lopsided as in Brandenburg. Weissensee and Köpenick, two comparatively wealthier boroughs of former East Berlin, narrowly voted in favour.

Older voters in both states approved it by a majority, whereas among voters aged 18-24 in Brandenburg, only 24% voted in favour.

=== Analysis ===
Reasons for the defeat of the referendum were that voters in Brandenburg feared being reduced to a rural backwater and losing identity, influence, and federal aid to the capital of Berlin. People also were concerned about the large and growing public debt of Berlin. In Berlin meanwhile, voters saw an advantage in reducing administrative costs. In addition, because Berlin has not had the same history of independence as the Free and Hanseatic Cities of Bremen and Hamburg, losing their status as a city-state did not concern many people. Berlin voters did fear losing out on equalization payments, Berlin having been the largest receiver by far.

A fusion would have hurt the clout of the region in the Bundesrat. Berlin and Brandenburg each have had four votes, a combined state would likely only have six, the maximum allocated under the degressive proportionality system of the Bundesrat.

== Aftermath ==
The referendum defeat ended any hopes for a quick unification, with the states now preferring to cooperate via other means, as explained above. These common initiatives have brought Berlin and Brandenburg closer together than perhaps any other pair of states. However, as recently as March 2022, the heads of government of both states have affirmed they do not plan a fusion.
