= Wiesenaue =

- Municipality
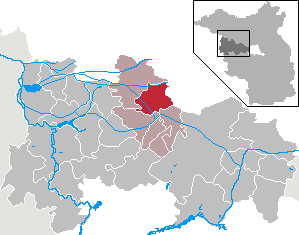
- Location of Wiesenaue within Havelland district
- Interactive map of Wiesenaue
- Location within Germany Location within Brandenburg
- Coordinates: 52°42′N 12°37′E
- Country: Germany
- State: Brandenburg
- District: Havelland
- Municipal assoc.: Friesack
- Subdivisions: 4 Ortsteile

Government
  - Mayor (2024–29): Heiko Gräning

Area
  - Total: 46.73 km^{2} (18.04 sq mi)
- Elevation: 27 m (89 ft)

Population (2025-12-31)
  - Total: 758
  - Density: 16.2/km^{2} (42.0/sq mi)
- Time zone: UTC+01:00 (CET)
  - Summer (DST): UTC+02:00 (CEST)
- Postal codes: 14662
- Dialling codes: 033237, 033235
- Vehicle registration: HVL
- Website: Amtsseite über Wiesenaue

Wiesenaue is a municipality in the Havelland district, in Brandenburg, Germany.

== Demography ==
Development of population since 1875 within the current boundaries (Blue line: Population; Dotted line: Comparison to population development of Brandenburg state; Grey background: Time of Nazi rule; Red background: Time of communist rule)

Wiesenaue: Population development
within the current boundaries (2013)

Year	Pop.	±% p.a.
1875	1,047	—
1890	1,072	+0.16%
1910	1,025	−0.22%
1925	1,095	+0.44%
1933	1,008	−1.03%
1939	1,132	+1.95%
1946	1,834	+7.14%
1950	1,943	+1.45%
1964	1,120	−3.86%
1971	1,139	+0.24%
1981	909	−2.23%
1985	910	+0.03%
1989	914	+0.11%
1990	898	−1.75%
1991	885	−1.45%
1992	877	−0.90%
1993	864	−1.48%
1994	837	−3.12%
1995	828	−1.08%
1996	832	+0.48%

Year	Pop.	±% p.a.
1997	803	−3.49%
1998	804	+0.12%
1999	795	−1.12%
2000	818	+2.89%
2001	832	+1.71%
2002	817	−1.80%
2003	801	−1.96%
2004	804	+0.37%
2005	797	−0.87%
2006	800	+0.38%
2007	787	−1.62%
2008	777	−1.27%
2009	789	+1.54%
2010	777	−1.52%
2011	759	−2.32%
2012	765	+0.79%
2013	750	−1.96%
2014	757	+0.93%
2015	738	−2.51%
2016	771	+4.47%
