= Mühlenberge =

- Municipality
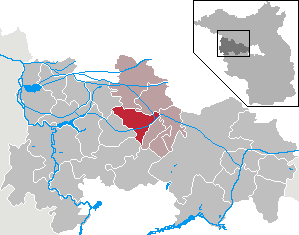
- Location of Mühlenberge within Havelland district
- Interactive map of Mühlenberge
- Location within Germany Location within Brandenburg
- Coordinates: 52°41′N 12°36′E
- Country: Germany
- State: Brandenburg
- District: Havelland
- Municipal assoc.: Friesack
- Subdivisions: 3 Ortsteile

Government
  - Mayor (2024–29): Susann Theel

Area
  - Total: 39.62 km^{2} (15.30 sq mi)
- Elevation: 36 m (118 ft)

Population (2025-12-31)
  - Total: 748
  - Density: 18.9/km^{2} (48.9/sq mi)
- Time zone: UTC+01:00 (CET)
  - Summer (DST): UTC+02:00 (CEST)
- Postal codes: 14662
- Dialling codes: 033237, 033238
- Vehicle registration: HVL

Mühlenberge (German pronunciation: [myːlənˈbɛʁɡə]) is a municipality in the Havelland district, in Brandenburg, Germany.

== Demography ==
Development of population since 1875 within the current boundaries (Blue line: Population; Dotted line: Comparison to population development of Brandenburg state; Grey background: Time of Nazi rule; Red background: Time of communist rule)

Mühlenberge: Population development
within the current boundaries (2013)

Year	Pop.	±% p.a.
1875	1,098	—
1890	1,191	+0.54%
1910	1,084	−0.47%
1925	1,094	+0.06%
1933	1,030	−0.75%
1939	914	−1.97%
1946	1,595	+8.28%
1950	1,665	+1.08%
1964	1,124	−2.77%
1971	1,088	−0.46%
1981	974	−1.10%
1985	959	−0.39%
1989	914	−1.19%
1990	926	+1.31%
1991	899	−2.92%
1992	884	−1.67%
1993	893	+1.02%
1994	879	−1.57%
1995	858	−2.39%
1996	857	−0.12%

Year	Pop.	±% p.a.
1997	885	+3.27%
1998	881	−0.45%
1999	868	−1.48%
2000	875	+0.81%
2001	825	−5.71%
2002	819	−0.73%
2003	824	+0.61%
2004	812	−1.46%
2005	792	−2.46%
2006	790	−0.25%
2007	797	+0.89%
2008	781	−2.01%
2009	759	−2.82%
2010	755	−0.53%
2011	729	−3.44%
2012	736	+0.96%
2013	710	−3.53%
2014	726	+2.25%
2015	720	−0.83%
2016	711	−1.25%
