= Friesack (Amt) =

- Amt
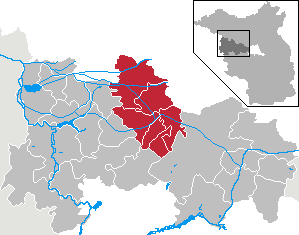
- Map of Havelland highlighting Friesack
- Interactive map of Friesack
- Location within Germany Location within Brandenburg
- Coordinates: 52°44′N 12°35′E
- Country: Germany
- State: Brandenburg
- District: Havelland
- Seat: Friesack
- Subdivisions: 6 municipalities

Area
  - Total: 237.39 km^{2} (91.66 sq mi)

Population (2025-12-31)
  - Total: 6,441
  - Density: 27.13/km^{2} (70.27/sq mi)
- Time zone: UTC+01:00 (CET)
  - Summer (DST): UTC+02:00 (CEST)
- Website: www.amt-friesack.de

Amt Friesack is an Amt ("collective municipality") in the district of Havelland, in Brandenburg, Germany. Its seat is in Friesack.

The Amt Friesack consists of the following municipalities:

1. Friesack
2. Mühlenberge
3. Paulinenaue
4. Pessin
5. Retzow
6. Wiesenaue

== Demography ==
Development of Population since 1875 within the Current Boundaries (Blue Line: Population; Dotted Line: Comparison to Population Development of Brandenburg state; Grey Background: Time of Nazi rule; Red Background: Time of Communist rule)

Recent Population Development and Projections (Population Development before Census 2011 (blue line); Recent Population Development according to the Census in Germany in 2011 (blue bordered line); Official projections for 2005-2030 (yellow line); for 2017-2030 (scarlet line); for 2020-2030 (green line)

Amt Friesack: Population development
within the current boundaries (2025)

Year	Pop.	±% p.a.
1875	7,721	—
1890	7,716	−0.00%
1910	7,159	−0.37%
1925	7,805	+0.58%
1933	7,682	−0.20%
1939	7,799	+0.25%
1946	11,727	+6.00%
1950	11,954	+0.48%
1964	9,054	−1.97%
1971	8,969	−0.13%

Year	Pop.	±% p.a.
1981	8,050	−1.08%
1985	7,965	−0.27%
1990	7,661	−0.78%
1995	7,456	−0.54%
2000	7,396	−0.16%
2005	6,995	−1.11%
2010	6,497	−1.47%
2015	6,658	+0.49%
2020	6,536	−0.37%
2025	6,441	−0.29%
