= Ketzin Cable Ferry =

Coordinates: 52.462847°N 12.854476°E

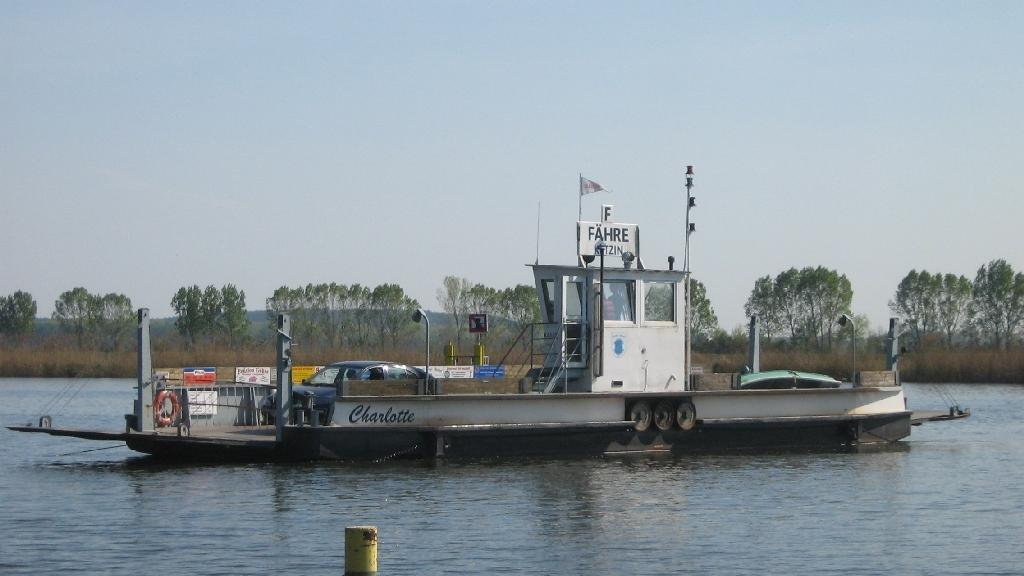
The Ketzin Cable Ferry

The Ketzin Cable Ferry is a vehicular cable ferry that crosses the River Havel between Ketzin and Schmergow, both located in Brandenburg, Germany.
