= Adalbert von Bredow =

German general (1814–1890)

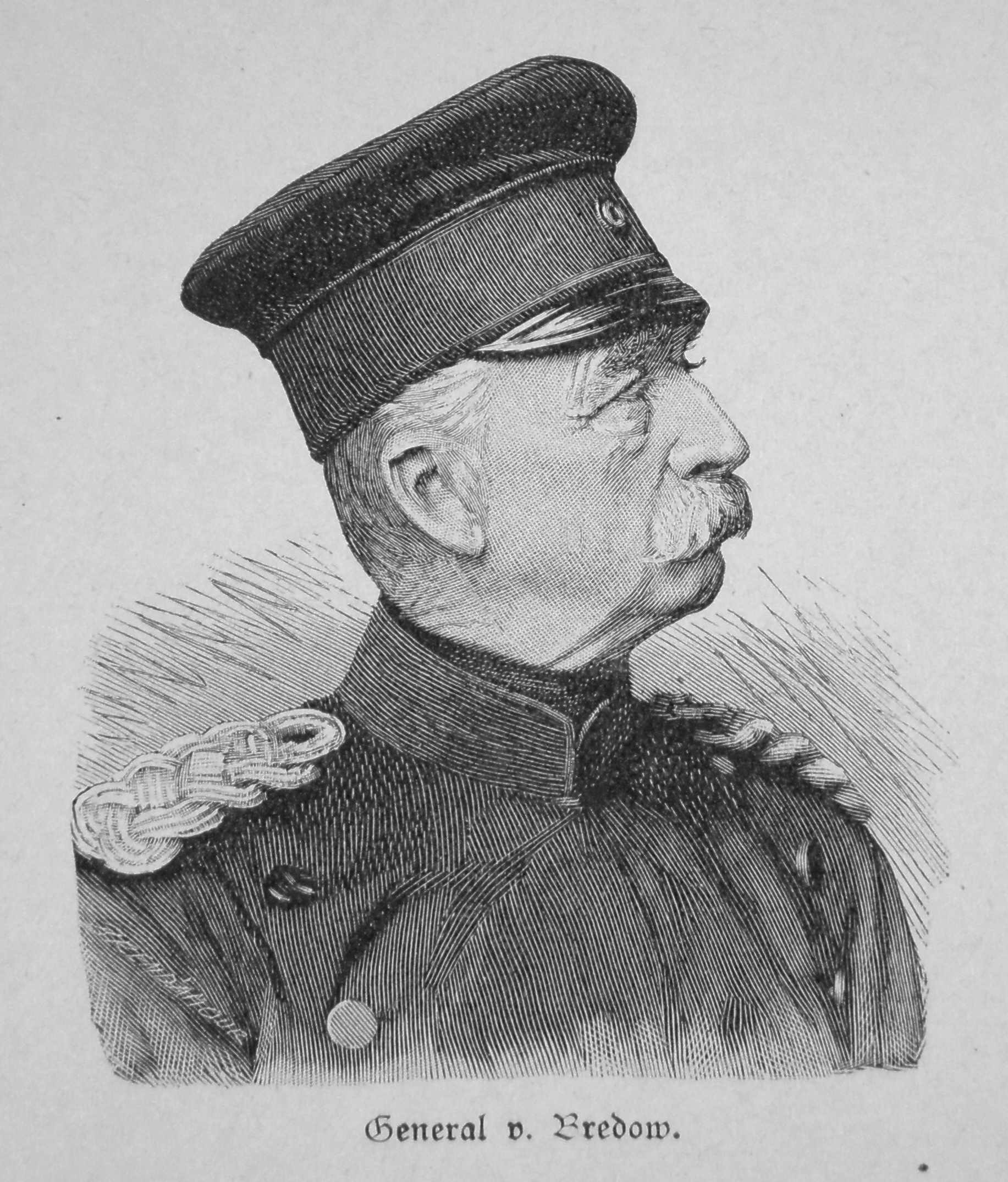
Adalbert von Bredow.

Friedrich William Adalbert von Bredow (24 May 1814 – 3 March 1890) was a German cavalry officer.

== Military career ==
Born at Briesen near Friesack in Brandenburg, to Friedrich von Bredow (1787–1878) and Bernhardine Sophie (née von Wulffen) (1792–1859), he joined the Garde-Husaren-Regiment in 1832 as a junior officer. By 1859, he had been given command of the 4th Dragoon Regiment. As a colonel, Bredow led the 2nd Cavalry Brigade in the Austro-Prussian War of 1866, and was promoted to major general.

He is best known as a hero of the Franco-Prussian War, for his actions during the Battle of Mars-la-Tour on 16 August 1870. During this battle, he commanded the Prussian 12th Cavalry Brigade on one of the last successful massed cavalry charges in warfare. Before his assault, Bredow laconically stated that "it will cost what it will". "Von Bredow's Death Ride" resulted in nearly 50% casualties on the Prussian forces, but he managed to defeat a French force that outnumbered them four to one. The event was used in the following decades by military tacticians to argue that cavalry charges could still win battles.

Bredow was subsequently promoted to lieutenant general and given command of the 18th Infantry Division. After the war's conclusion, he was awarded the Order of the Red Eagle on 2 December 1873.

== Literature ==
- Michael Howard: The Franco-Prussian War. The German Invasion of France, 1870–1871. London 2001.
