= Kleßen-Görne =

- Municipality
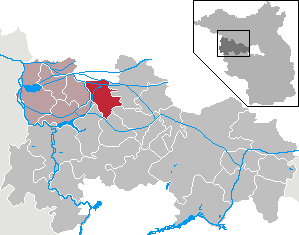
- Location of Kleßen-Görne within Havelland district
- Interactive map of Kleßen-Görne
- Location within Germany Location within Brandenburg
- Coordinates: 52°42′00″N 12°30′59″E
- Country: Germany
- State: Brandenburg
- District: Havelland
- Municipal assoc.: Rhinow
- Subdivisions: 3 Ortsteile

Government
  - Mayor (2024–29): Paul Egon Zander

Area
  - Total: 42.01 km^{2} (16.22 sq mi)
- Elevation: 35 m (115 ft)

Population (2025-12-31)
  - Total: 325
  - Density: 7.74/km^{2} (20.0/sq mi)
- Time zone: UTC+01:00 (CET)
  - Summer (DST): UTC+02:00 (CEST)
- Postal codes: 14728
- Dialling codes: 033235
- Vehicle registration: HVL
- Website: www.rhinow.de

Kleßen-Görne is a municipality in the Havelland district, in Brandenburg, Germany.

== Demography ==
Development of population since 1875 within the current boundaries (Blue line: Population; Dotted line: Comparison to population development of Brandenburg state; Grey background: Time of Nazi rule; Red background: Time of communist rule)

Kleßen-Görne: Population development
within the current boundaries (2013)

| Year | Pop. | ±% p.a. |
|---|---|---|
| 1875 | 737 | — |
| 1890 | 758 | +0.19% |
| 1910 | 668 | −0.63% |
| 1925 | 663 | −0.05% |
| 1933 | 674 | +0.21% |
| 1939 | 660 | −0.35% |
| 1946 | 1,025 | +6.49% |
| 1950 | 1,109 | +1.99% |
| 1964 | 609 | −4.19% |
| 1971 | 627 | +0.42% |
| 1981 | 530 | −1.67% |
| 1985 | 559 | +1.34% |
| 1989 | 521 | −1.74% |
| 1990 | 512 | −1.73% |
| 1991 | 517 | +0.98% |
| 1992 | 515 | −0.39% |
| 1993 | 502 | −2.52% |
| 1994 | 499 | −0.60% |
| 1995 | 497 | −0.40% |
| 1996 | 475 | −4.43% |

| Year | Pop. | ±% p.a. |
|---|---|---|
| 1997 | 461 | −2.95% |
| 1998 | 495 | +7.38% |
| 1999 | 489 | −1.21% |
| 2000 | 483 | −1.23% |
| 2001 | 473 | −2.07% |
| 2002 | 456 | −3.59% |
| 2003 | 442 | −3.07% |
| 2004 | 438 | −0.90% |
| 2005 | 425 | −2.97% |
| 2006 | 412 | −3.06% |
| 2007 | 409 | −0.73% |
| 2008 | 410 | +0.24% |
| 2009 | 404 | −1.46% |
| 2010 | 393 | −2.72% |
| 2011 | 367 | −6.62% |
| 2012 | 349 | −4.90% |
| 2013 | 354 | +1.43% |
| 2014 | 340 | −3.95% |
| 2015 | 339 | −0.29% |
| 2016 | 360 | +6.19% |
