= Gollenberg =

- Municipality
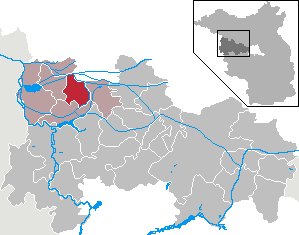
- Location of Gollenberg within Havelland district
- Interactive map of Gollenberg
- Location within Germany Location within Brandenburg
- Coordinates: 52°45′10″N 12°22′32″E
- Country: Germany
- State: Brandenburg
- District: Havelland
- Municipal assoc.: Rhinow

Government
  - Mayor (2024–29): Wolfgang Heinze (FDP)

Area
  - Total: 30.51 km^{2} (11.78 sq mi)
- Elevation: 27 m (89 ft)

Population (2025-12-31)
  - Total: 387
  - Density: 12.7/km^{2} (32.9/sq mi)
- Time zone: UTC+01:00 (CET)
  - Summer (DST): UTC+02:00 (CEST)
- Postal codes: 14728
- Dialling codes: 033875
- Vehicle registration: HVL
- Website: www.rhinow.de

Gollenberg (German pronunciation: [ˈɡɔlənbɛʁk]) is a municipality in the Havelland district, in Brandenburg, Germany consisting of Schönholz-Neuwerder, Stölln and Ohnewitz.

== History ==
The municipality is named after the Gollenberg near Stölln and was created December 31, 2002 when the municipalities of Schönholz-Neuwerder and Stölln were merged.

== Demography ==
Development of population since 1875 within the current boundaries (Blue line: Population; Dotted line: Comparison to population development of Brandenburg state; Grey background: Time of Nazi rule; Red background: Time of communist rule)

Gollenberg: Population development
within the current boundaries (2013)

Year	Pop.	±% p.a.
1875	582	—
1890	522	−0.72%
1910	560	+0.35%
1925	546	−0.17%
1933	442	−2.61%
1939	378	−2.57%
1946	956	+14.17%
1950	904	−1.39%
1964	643	−2.40%
1971	656	+0.29%
1981	576	−1.29%
1985	578	+0.09%
1989	540	−1.69%
1990	527	−2.41%
1991	529	+0.38%
1992	525	−0.76%
1993	514	−2.10%
1994	495	−3.70%
1995	503	+1.62%
1996	520	+3.38%

Year	Pop.	±% p.a.
1997	510	−1.92%
1998	514	+0.78%
1999	512	−0.39%
2000	505	−1.37%
2001	499	−1.19%
2002	481	−3.61%
2003	467	−2.91%
2004	469	+0.43%
2005	472	+0.64%
2006	453	−4.03%
2007	447	−1.32%
2008	445	−0.45%
2009	444	−0.22%
2010	429	−3.38%
2011	432	+0.70%
2012	433	+0.23%
2013	429	−0.92%
2014	417	−2.80%
2015	408	−2.16%
2016	413	+1.23%

== Aviation ==
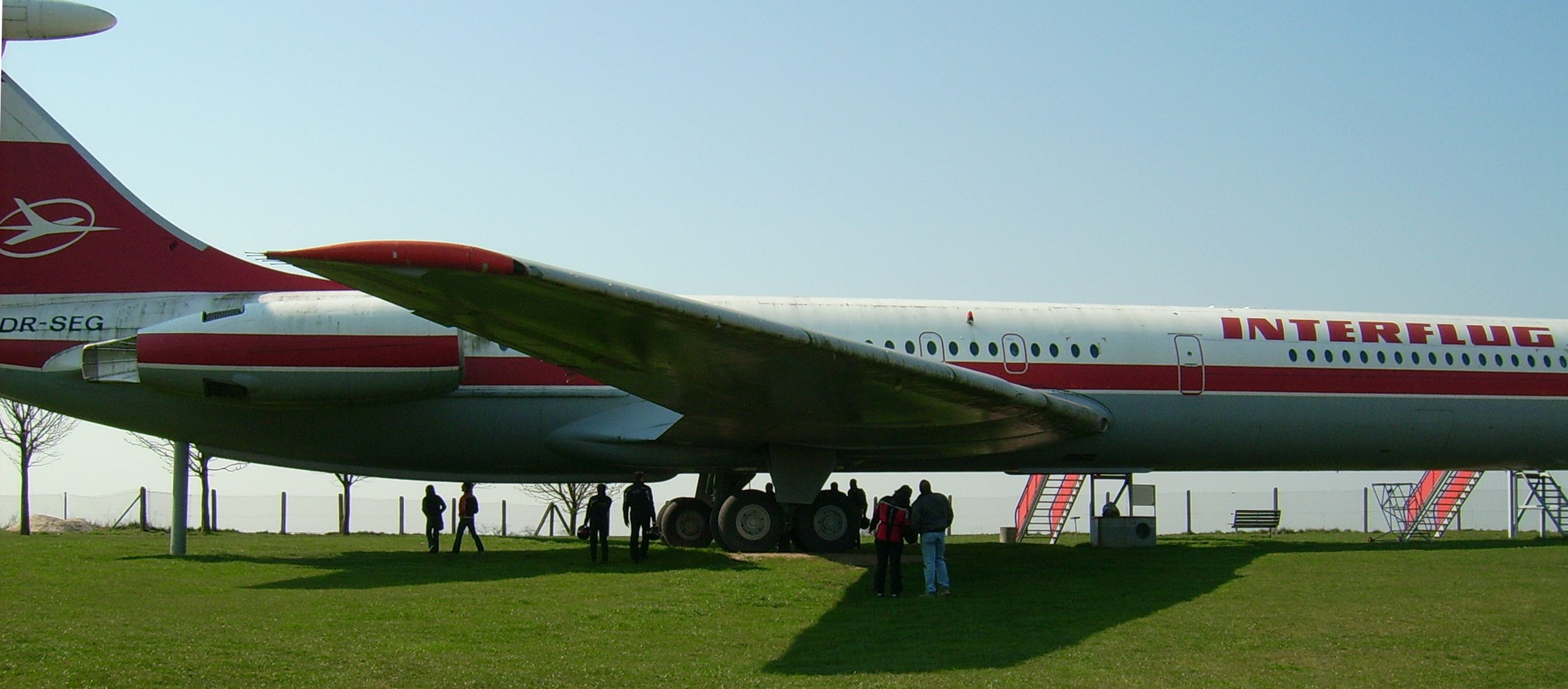
"Lady Agnes" Il-62 - Airport Stölln/Rhinow

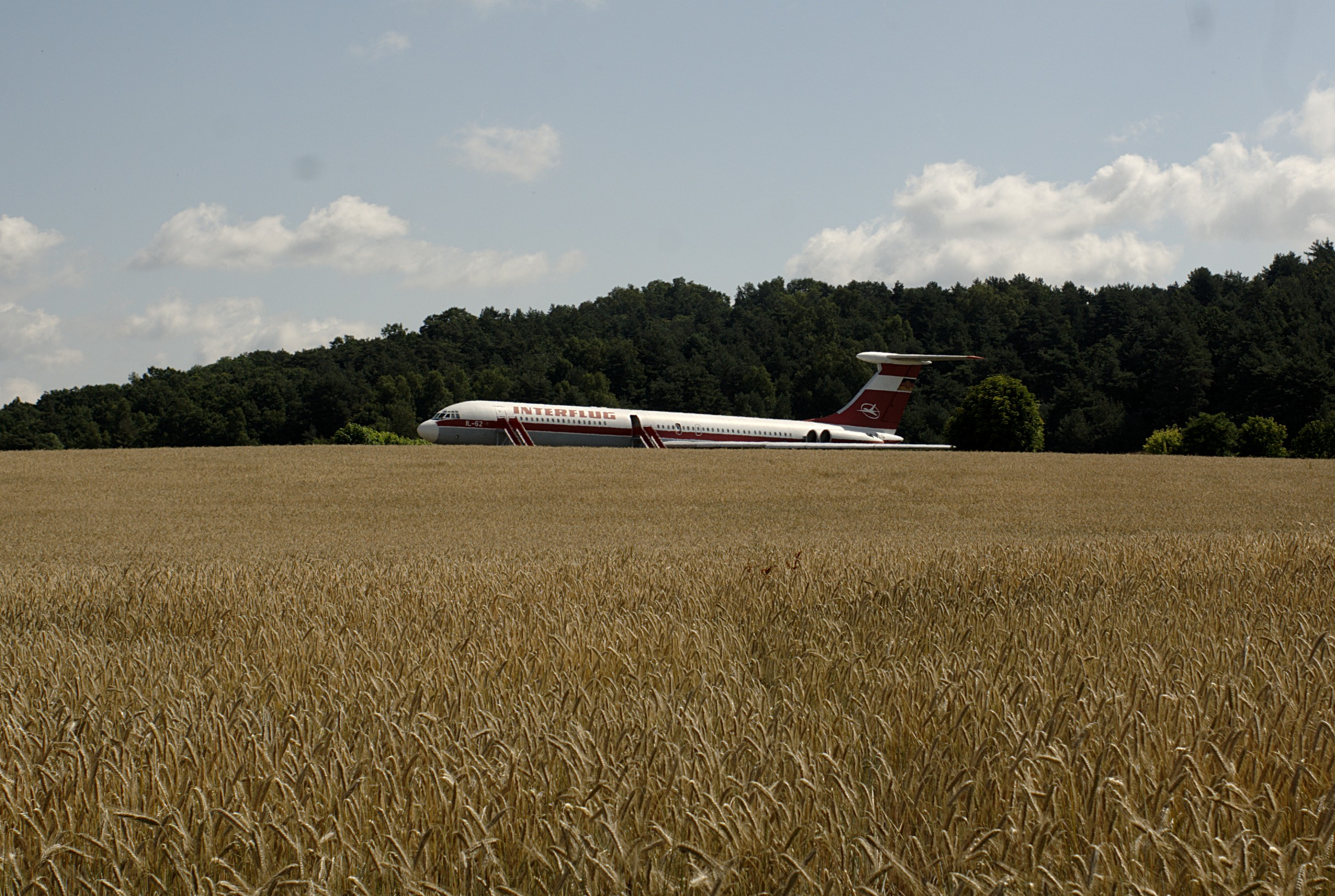
"Lady Agnes" Il-62

=== Otto Lilienthal ===
Aviation pioneer Otto Lilienthal (1848–1896) crashed his glider here and died later.

=== Lady Agnes ===
On October 23, 1989, an Ilyushin Il-62 jet airliner was intentionally landed on the 900m short grass airfield of Stölln/Rhinow in a risky maneuver. The jet, donated by the GDR's airline Interflug and nicknamed "Lady Agnes" after Lilienthal's wife, is now used for weddings.

=== Air sport events at Stölln/Rhinow airfield ===
- The 23rd national youth gliding competition Bundesjugendvergleichsfliegen (not to be mixed with Junior Nationals) took place in Stölln/Rhinow in 2007.
- The 2007 club championships in glider aerobatics "Salzmann Cup" took place at Stölln/Rhinow airfield.
- Since 2004, the cross-country soaring competition "Cats Cradle Club Cup" takes place at Stölln/Rhinow airfield regularly.
- About 100 pilots participated in the fly-in for celebrating '100 years human flight' in May 1991.
