= Rhinow =

- Town
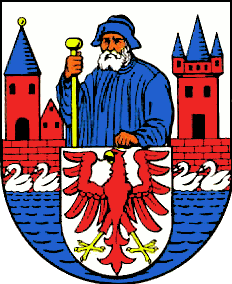
- Coat of arms

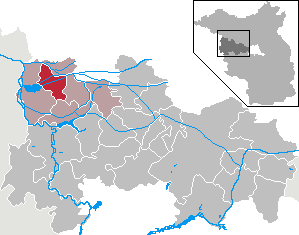
- Location of Rhinow within Havelland district
- Interactive map of Rhinow
- Location within Germany Location within Brandenburg
- Coordinates: 52°45′00″N 12°19′59″E
- Country: Germany
- State: Brandenburg
- District: Havelland
- Municipal assoc.: Rhinow

Government
  - Mayor (2024–29): Stefan Schneider (SPD)

Area
  - Total: 31.66 km^{2} (12.22 sq mi)
- Elevation: 30 m (98 ft)

Population (2025-12-31)
  - Total: 1,614
  - Density: 50.98/km^{2} (132.0/sq mi)
- Time zone: UTC+01:00 (CET)
  - Summer (DST): UTC+02:00 (CEST)
- Postal codes: 14728
- Dialling codes: 033875
- Vehicle registration: HVL
- Website: www.rhinow.de

Rhinow (German: [ˈʁiːnoː]) is a town in the Havelland district (Landkreis), in Brandenburg, Germany. It is situated 16 km north of Rathenow, and 22 km south of Kyritz. Rhinow is the administrative seat (Verwaltungssitz) of the Rhinow district (Amt).

== Geography ==
The region lies on the southern edge of the Rhinluch (Rhin moor) and at the feet of the up to 110 Meter high Rhinower Mountains. The Rhin river flows west through the district into the Gülper See at the southwestern border. Federal highway (Bundesstraße) 102 cuts through the area. Since 2003, the stretch between Rathenow and Neustadt (Dosse) is no longer served by public rail transit (Öffentlichen Personennahverkehr).

== Administrative division ==
Greater Rhinow includes the village of Kietz.

== History ==
During the Third Reich, a famous sail plane school was founded in memory of Otto Lilienthal.

== Demography ==
Development of population since 1875 within the current boundaries (Blue line: Population; Dotted line: Comparison to population development of Brandenburg state; Grey background: Time of Nazi rule; Red background: Time of communist rule)

Rhinow: Population development
within the current boundaries (2013)

Year	Pop.	±% p.a.
1875	1,397	—
1890	1,512	+0.53%
1910	1,540	+0.09%
1925	1,533	−0.03%
1933	1,551	+0.15%
1939	1,713	+1.67%
1946	2,728	+6.87%
1950	2,553	−1.64%
1964	2,051	−1.55%
1971	2,052	+0.01%
1981	2,198	+0.69%
1985	2,213	+0.17%
1989	2,222	+0.10%
1990	2,146	−3.42%
1991	2,090	−2.61%
1992	2,065	−1.20%
1993	2,086	+1.02%
1994	2,070	−0.77%
1995	2,103	+1.59%
1996	2,111	+0.38%

Year	Pop.	±% p.a.
1997	2,154	+2.04%
1998	2,165	+0.51%
1999	2,146	−0.88%
2000	2,101	−2.10%
2001	2,021	−3.81%
2002	2,012	−0.45%
2003	1,967	−2.24%
2004	1,959	−0.41%
2005	1,933	−1.33%
2006	1,874	−3.05%
2007	1,821	−2.83%
2008	1,758	−3.46%
2009	1,714	−2.50%
2010	1,716	+0.12%
2011	1,695	−1.22%
2012	1,667	−1.65%
2013	1,640	−1.62%
2014	1,649	+0.55%
2015	1,625	−1.46%
2016	1,614	−0.68%

== City Council ==
The council of the city of Rhinow has 12 members with the following distribution by political party:

- FDP 6 seats
- SPD 3 seats
- CDU 2 seats
- Die Linke 1 seat

(As of elections held on September 28, 2008)

Elections in 2014:

- SPD: 4
- FDP: 2
- The Left: 2
- CDU: 1
- Single candidates: 3

== Architecture ==
- 101 Meter high radio tower belonging to Deutsche Telekom AG constructed from reinforced concrete with uncustomary asymmetry at 52° 44′ 45″ N, 12° 21′ 7″ E, was built during the Soviet era.

== Personalities ==
- Otto Lilienthal (1848-1896), settled in Rhinow in 1893, building his workshop for his glider. In the beginning, he flew also in the Rhinow Mountains, later switching to flying at Gollenberg.
