= Rhinow (Amt) =

- Amt
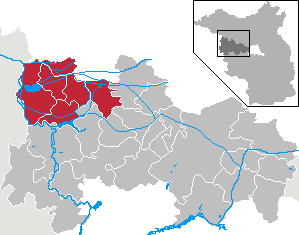
- Map of Havelland highlighting Rhinow
- Interactive map of Rhinow
- Location within Germany Location within Brandenburg
- Coordinates: 52°45′N 12°20′E
- Country: Germany
- State: Brandenburg
- District: Havelland
- Seat: Rhinow
- Subdivisions: 6 municipalities

Area
  - Total: 247.73 km^{2} (95.65 sq mi)

Population (2025-12-31)
  - Total: 4,511
  - Density: 18.21/km^{2} (47.16/sq mi)
- Time zone: UTC+01:00 (CET)
  - Summer (DST): UTC+02:00 (CEST)
- Website: www.rhinow.de

Amt Rhinow is an Amt ("collective municipality") in the district of Havelland, in Brandenburg, Germany. Its seat is in Rhinow.

The Amt Rhinow consists of the following municipalities:

1. Gollenberg
2. Großderschau
3. Havelaue
4. Kleßen-Görne
5. Rhinow
6. Seeblick

== Demography ==
Development of Population since 1875 within the Current Boundaries (Blue Line: Population; Dotted Line: Comparison to Population Development of Brandenburg state; Grey Background: Time of Nazi rule; Red Background: Time of Communist rule)

Recent Population Development and Projections (Population Development before Census 2011 (blue line); Recent Population Development according to the Census in Germany in 2011 (blue bordered line); Official projections for 2005-2030 (yellow line); for 2017-2030 (scarlet line); for 2020-2030 (green line)

Amt Rhinow: Population development
within the current boundaries (2020)

Year	Pop.	±% p.a.
1875	6,836	—
1890	6,651	−0.18%
1910	6,654	+0.00%
1925	6,545	−0.11%
1939	6,340	−0.23%
1950	9,787	+4.03%
1964	6,923	−2.44%
1971	6,796	−0.26%
1981	6,168	−0.96%

Year	Pop.	±% p.a.
1985	6,214	+0.19%
1990	5,973	−0.79%
1995	5,725	−0.84%
2000	5,678	−0.16%
2005	5,395	−1.02%
2010	4,933	−1.77%
2015	4,597	−1.40%
2020	4,547	−0.22%
2025	4,511	−0.16%
