= Seeblick =

- Municipality
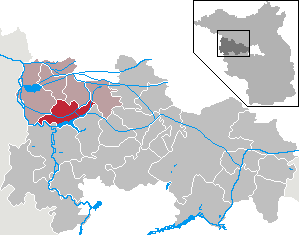
- Location of Seeblick within Havelland district
- Interactive map of Seeblick
- Location within Germany Location within Brandenburg
- Coordinates: 52°40′N 12°23′E
- Country: Germany
- State: Brandenburg
- District: Havelland
- Municipal assoc.: Rhinow
- Subdivisions: 3 Ortsteile

Government
  - Mayor (2024–29): Patrick Höffler

Area
  - Total: 47.94 km^{2} (18.51 sq mi)
- Elevation: 25 m (82 ft)

Population (2025-12-31)
  - Total: 886
  - Density: 18.5/km^{2} (47.9/sq mi)
- Time zone: UTC+01:00 (CET)
  - Summer (DST): UTC+02:00 (CEST)
- Postal codes: 14728
- Dialling codes: 033875
- Vehicle registration: HVL
- Website: www.rhinow.de

Seeblick is a municipality in the Havelland district, in Brandenburg, Germany.

== Demography ==
Development of population since 1875 within the current boundaries (Blue line: Population; Dotted line: Comparison to population development of Brandenburg state; Grey background: Time of Nazi rule; Red background: Time of communist rule)

Seeblick: Population development
within the current boundaries (2013)

Year	Pop.	±% p.a.
1875	721	—
1890	744	+0.21%
1910	810	+0.43%
1925	886	+0.60%
1933	851	−0.50%
1939	956	+1.96%
1946	1,465	+6.29%
1950	1,403	−1.08%
1964	1,075	−1.88%
1971	1,028	−0.64%
1981	990	−0.38%
1985	1,021	+0.77%
1989	1,049	+0.68%
1990	1,017	−3.05%
1991	971	−4.52%
1992	958	−1.34%
1993	935	−2.40%
1994	937	+0.21%
1995	961	+2.56%
1996	964	+0.31%

Year	Pop.	±% p.a.
1997	938	−2.70%
1998	961	+2.45%
1999	975	+1.46%
2000	988	+1.33%
2001	1,000	+1.21%
2002	990	−1.00%
2003	1,007	+1.72%
2004	993	−1.39%
2005	1,003	+1.01%
2006	972	−3.09%
2007	959	−1.34%
2008	941	−1.88%
2009	949	+0.85%
2010	946	−0.32%
2011	928	−1.90%
2012	914	−1.51%
2013	919	+0.55%
2014	922	+0.33%
2015	910	−1.30%
2016	906	−0.44%
