= Großderschau =

- Municipality
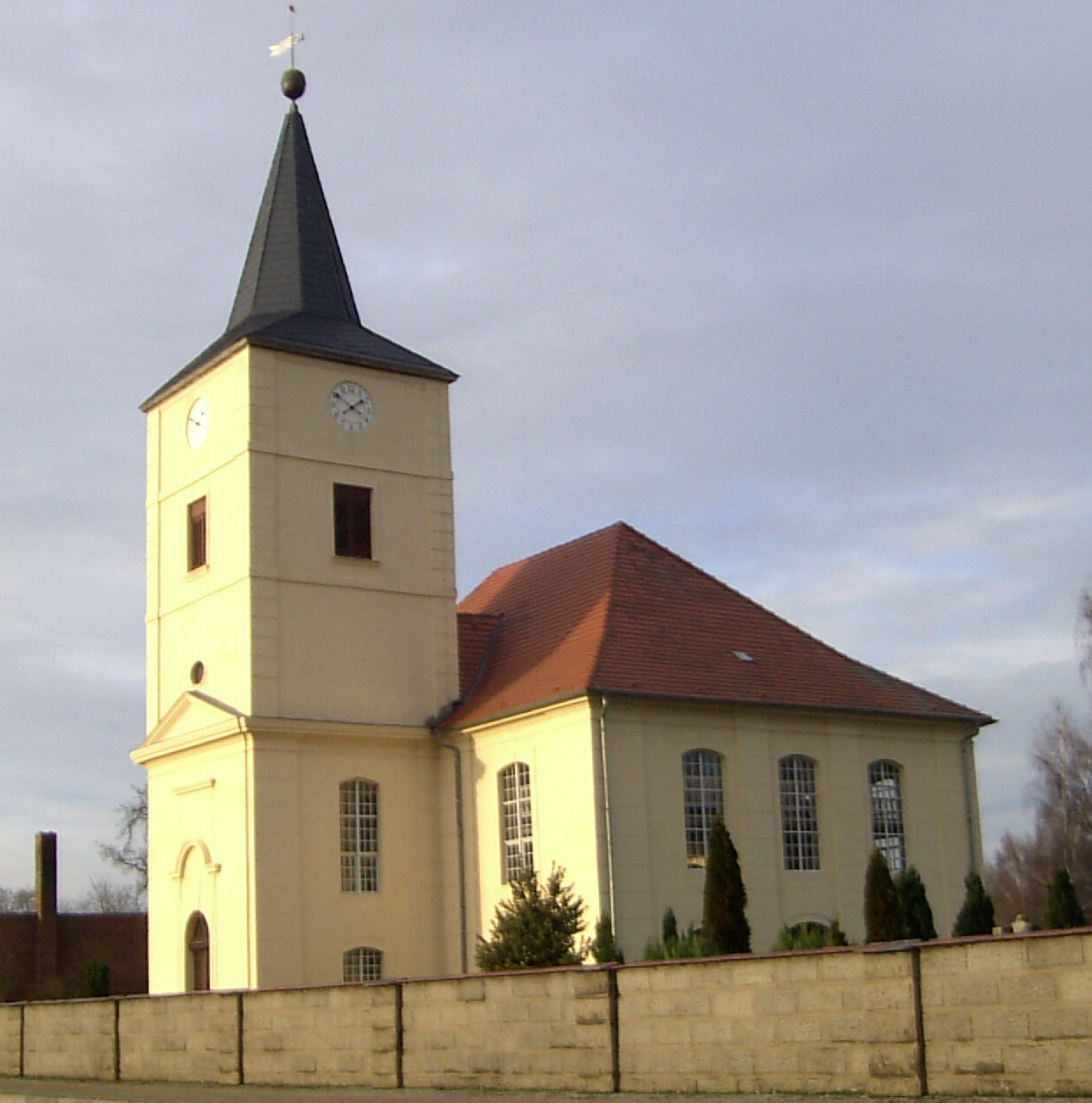
- Church

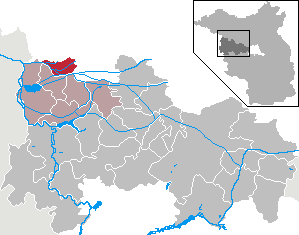
- Location of Großderschau within Havelland district
- Interactive map of Großderschau
- Location within Germany Location within Brandenburg
- Coordinates: 52°47′29″N 12°22′9″E
- Country: Germany
- State: Brandenburg
- District: Havelland
- Municipal assoc.: Rhinow
- Subdivisions: 2 Ortsteile

Government
  - Mayor (2024–29): Ivonne Ratzmer

Area
  - Total: 20.00 km^{2} (7.72 sq mi)
- Elevation: 27 m (89 ft)

Population (2025-12-31)
  - Total: 419
  - Density: 20.9/km^{2} (54.3/sq mi)
- Time zone: UTC+01:00 (CET)
  - Summer (DST): UTC+02:00 (CEST)
- Postal codes: 16845
- Dialling codes: 033875
- Vehicle registration: HVL
- Website: www.rhinow.de

Großderschau is a municipality in the Havelland district, in Brandenburg, Germany. The Dosse river runs past the town.

== Demography ==
Development of population since 1875 within the current boundaries (Blue line: Population; Dotted line: Comparison to population development of Brandenburg state; Grey background: Time of Nazi rule; Red background: Time of communist rule)

Großderschau: Population development
within the current boundaries (2013)

Year	Pop.	±% p.a.
1875	1,243	—
1890	1,072	−0.98%
1910	909	−0.82%
1925	906	−0.02%
1933	824	−1.18%
1939	807	−0.35%
1946	1,374	+7.90%
1950	1,272	−1.91%
1964	859	−2.77%
1971	797	−1.06%
1981	635	−2.25%
1985	606	−1.16%
1989	616	+0.41%
1990	607	−1.46%
1991	604	−0.49%
1992	583	−3.48%
1993	594	+1.89%
1994	585	−1.52%
1995	586	+0.17%
1996	578	−1.37%

Year	Pop.	±% p.a.
1997	584	+1.04%
1998	594	+1.71%
1999	590	−0.67%
2000	588	−0.34%
2001	595	+1.19%
2002	586	−1.51%
2003	558	−4.78%
2004	551	−1.25%
2005	545	−1.09%
2006	548	+0.55%
2007	519	−5.29%
2008	527	+1.54%
2009	515	−2.28%
2010	492	−4.47%
2011	467	−5.08%
2012	464	−0.64%
2013	453	−2.37%
2014	449	−0.88%
2015	437	−2.67%
2016	444	+1.60%
