= Pessin =

- Municipality
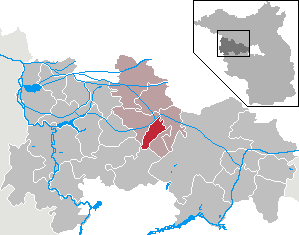
- Location of Pessin within Havelland district
- Interactive map of Pessin
- Location within Germany Location within Brandenburg
- Coordinates: 52°38′59″N 12°40′00″E
- Country: Germany
- State: Brandenburg
- District: Havelland
- Municipal assoc.: Friesack

Government
  - Mayor (2024–29): Andreas Flender (Ind.)

Area
  - Total: 20.28 km^{2} (7.83 sq mi)
- Elevation: 35 m (115 ft)

Population (2025-12-31)
  - Total: 594
  - Density: 29.3/km^{2} (75.9/sq mi)
- Time zone: UTC+01:00 (CET)
  - Summer (DST): UTC+02:00 (CEST)
- Postal codes: 14641
- Dialling codes: 033237
- Vehicle registration: HVL
- Website: Gemeinde Pessin

Pessin is a municipality in the Havelland district, in Brandenburg, Germany.

== Demography ==
Development of population since 1875 within the current boundaries (Blue line: Population; Dotted line: Comparison to population development of Brandenburg state; Grey background: Time of Nazi rule; Red background: Time of communist rule)

Pessin: Population development
within the current boundaries (2013)

Year	Pop.	±% p.a.
1875	407	—
1890	367	−0.69%
1910	353	−0.19%
1925	578	+3.34%
1933	635	+1.18%
1939	666	+0.80%
1946	938	+5.01%
1950	957	+0.50%
1964	766	−1.58%
1971	809	+0.78%
1981	713	−1.26%
1985	731	+0.63%
1989	735	+0.14%
1990	723	−1.63%
1991	721	−0.28%
1992	761	+5.55%
1993	759	−0.26%
1994	758	−0.13%
1995	750	−1.06%
1996	729	−2.80%

Year	Pop.	±% p.a.
1997	726	−0.41%
1998	739	+1.79%
1999	751	+1.62%
2000	734	−2.26%
2001	689	−6.13%
2002	681	−1.16%
2003	693	+1.76%
2004	662	−4.47%
2005	677	+2.27%
2006	651	−3.84%
2007	668	+2.61%
2008	658	−1.50%
2009	654	−0.61%
2010	647	−1.07%
2011	669	+3.40%
2012	659	−1.49%
2013	644	−2.28%
2014	649	+0.78%
2015	650	+0.15%
2016	662	+1.85%
