= Brieselang =

- Municipality
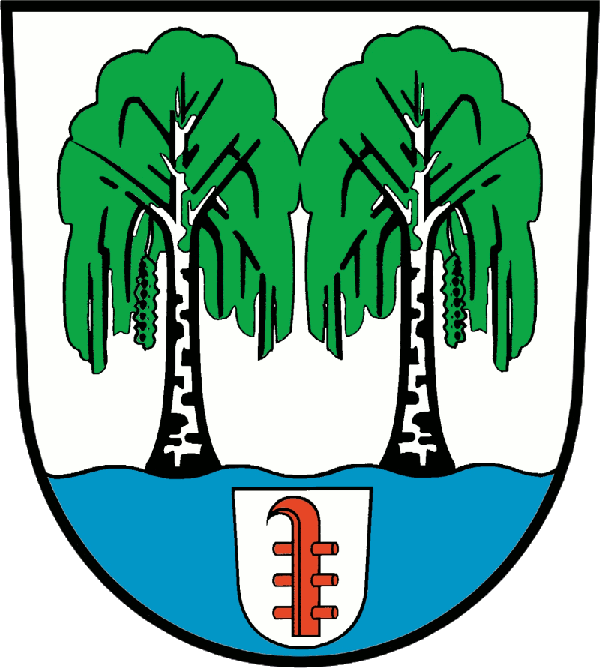
- Coat of arms

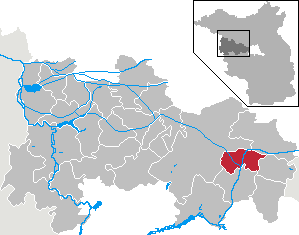
- Location of Brieselang within Havelland district
- Interactive map of Brieselang
- Location within Germany Location within Brandenburg
- Coordinates: 52°35′N 13°00′E
- Country: Germany
- State: Brandenburg
- District: Havelland
- Subdivisions: 9 Ortsteile Brieselang (Nord/Süd), Bredow, Zeestow, Alt Brieselang, Bredow-Luch, Bredow-Vorwerk & Glien

Government
  - Mayor (2023–31): Kathrin Neumann-Riedel

Area
  - Total: 44.39 km^{2} (17.14 sq mi)
- Elevation: 30 m (98 ft)

Population (2025-12-31)
  - Total: 13,192
  - Density: 297.2/km^{2} (769.7/sq mi)
- Time zone: UTC+01:00 (CET)
  - Summer (DST): UTC+02:00 (CEST)
- Postal codes: 14656
- Dialling codes: 033232, 033234, 03321
- Vehicle registration: HVL

Brieselang is a municipality in the Havelland district, in Brandenburg, Germany.

== Demography ==
Development of Population since 1875 within the Current Boundaries (Blue Line: Population; Dotted Line: Comparison to Population Development of Brandenburg state; Grey Background: Time of Nazi rule; Red Background: Time of Communist rule)

Recent Population Development and Projections (Population Development before Census 2011 (blue line); Recent Population Development according to the Census in Germany in 2011 (blue bordered line); Official projections for 2005-2030 (yellow line); for 2017-2030 (scarlet line); for 2020-2030 (green line)

Brieselang: Population development
within the current boundaries (2020)

Year	Pop.	±% p.a.
1875	1,175	—
1890	1,264	+0.49%
1910	1,099	−0.70%
1925	2,516	+5.68%
1939	4,955	+4.96%
1950	6,416	+2.38%
1964	6,009	−0.47%

Year	Pop.	±% p.a.
1971	6,054	+0.11%
1981	5,481	−0.99%
1985	5,359	−0.56%
1990	5,104	−0.97%
1995	5,513	+1.55%
2000	8,973	+10.23%
2005	10,457	+3.11%

Year	Pop.	±% p.a.
2010	10,854	+0.75%
2015	11,484	+1.13%
2016	11,534	+0.44%
2017	11,714	+1.56%
2018	11,999	+2.43%
2019	12,193	+1.62%
2020	12,512	+2.62%
