= Ketzin =

- Town
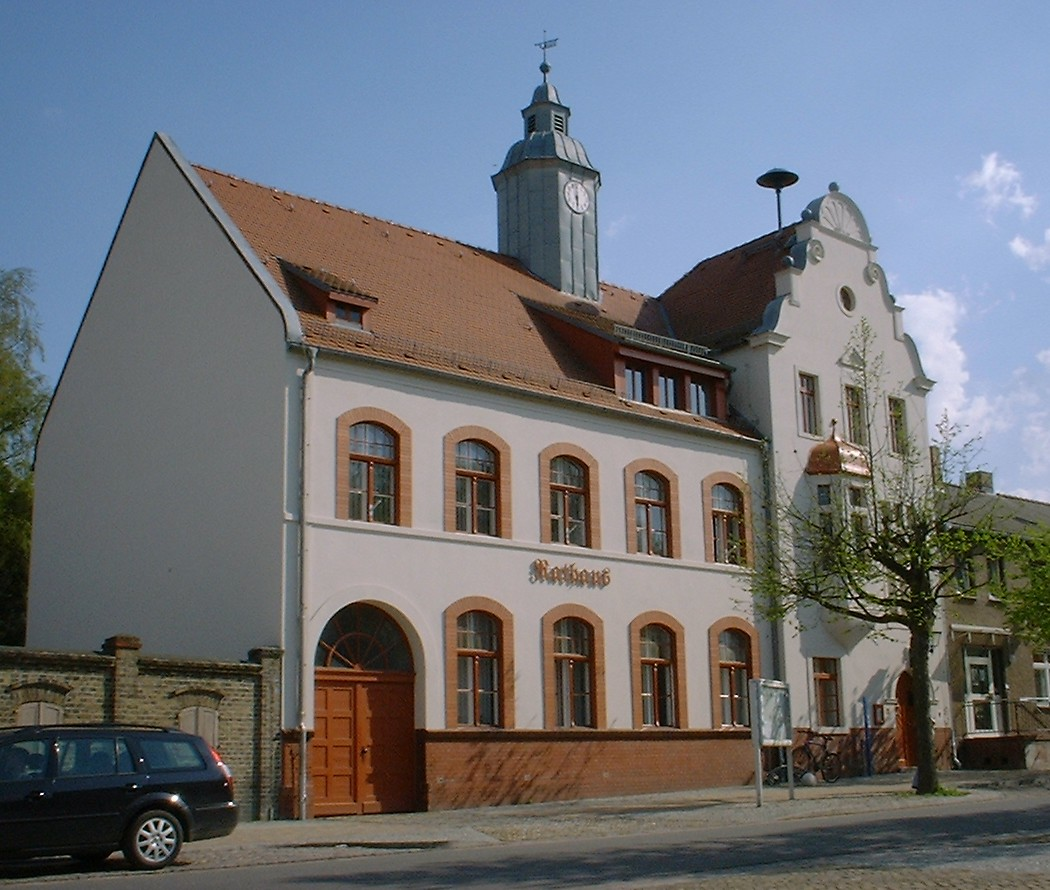
- Town hall

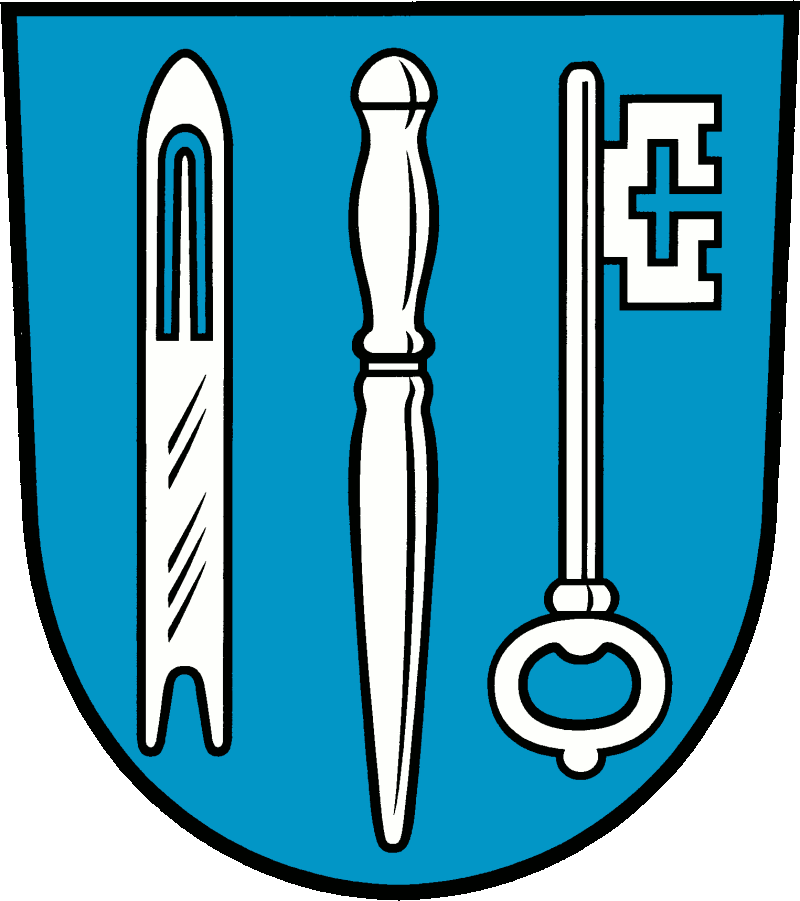
- Coat of arms

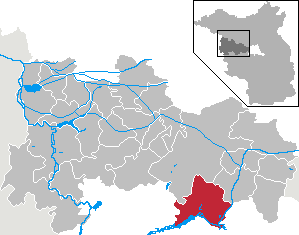
- Location of Ketzin within Havelland district
- Interactive map of Ketzin
- Location within Germany Location within Brandenburg
- Coordinates: 52°28′11″N 12°50′42″E
- Country: Germany
- State: Brandenburg
- District: Havelland

Government
  - Mayor (2022–30): Katrin Mußhoff (SPD)

Area
  - Total: 93.64 km^{2} (36.15 sq mi)
- Elevation: 32 m (105 ft)

Population (2025-12-31)
  - Total: 6,636
  - Density: 70.87/km^{2} (183.5/sq mi)
- Time zone: UTC+01:00 (CET)
  - Summer (DST): UTC+02:00 (CEST)
- Postal codes: 14669
- Dialling codes: 033233
- Vehicle registration: HVL
- Website: www.ketzin.de

Ketzin (German: [kɛˈtsiːn], official name: Ketzin/Havel) is a town in the Havelland district, in Brandenburg, Germany. It is situated on the river Havel, 17 km northwest of Potsdam, and 40 km west of Berlin.

== History ==
Ketzin was first mentioned in 1197 by a document. Until 1571, Ketzin was kept in the Bishopric of Brandenburg, the imperial principality of the Prince-bishop of the Diocese of Brandenburg and according to the law, not part of the Margraviate of Brandenburg.

== Demography ==
Development of Population since 1875 within the Current Boundaries (Blue Line: Population; Dotted Line: Comparison to Population Development of Brandenburg state; Grey Background: Time of Nazi rule; Red Background: Time of Communist rule)

Recent Population Development and Projections (Population Development before Census 2011 (blue line); Recent Population Development according to the Census in Germany in 2011 (blue bordered line); Official projections for 2005–2030 (yellow line); for 2017–2030 (scarlet line); for 2020–2030 (green line)

Ketzin/Havel: Population development
within the current boundaries (2020)

| Year | Pop. | ±% p.a. |
|---|---|---|
| 1875 | 6,320 | — |
| 1890 | 7,699 | +1.32% |
| 1910 | 7,804 | +0.07% |
| 1925 | 6,808 | −0.91% |
| 1939 | 6,896 | +0.09% |
| 1950 | 10,149 | +3.58% |
| 1964 | 7,821 | −1.84% |

| Year | Pop. | ±% p.a. |
|---|---|---|
| 1971 | 8,031 | +0.38% |
| 1981 | 7,008 | −1.35% |
| 1985 | 6,883 | −0.45% |
| 1990 | 6,488 | −1.18% |
| 1995 | 6,416 | −0.22% |
| 2000 | 6,442 | +0.08% |
| 2005 | 6,541 | +0.31% |

| Year | Pop. | ±% p.a. |
|---|---|---|
| 2010 | 6,405 | −0.42% |
| 2015 | 6,412 | +0.02% |
| 2016 | 6,474 | +0.97% |
| 2017 | 6,503 | +0.45% |
| 2018 | 6,498 | −0.08% |
| 2019 | 6,530 | +0.49% |
| 2020 | 6,595 | +1.00% |

== Geography ==
The town counts 6 Ortsteile (civil parishes): Etzin, Falkenrehde, Knoblauch, Paretz, Tremmen and Zachow.

== Transport ==
The Ketzin Cable Ferry, a vehicular cable ferry, crosses the Havel between Ketzin and Schmergow.
