= Friesack =

- Town
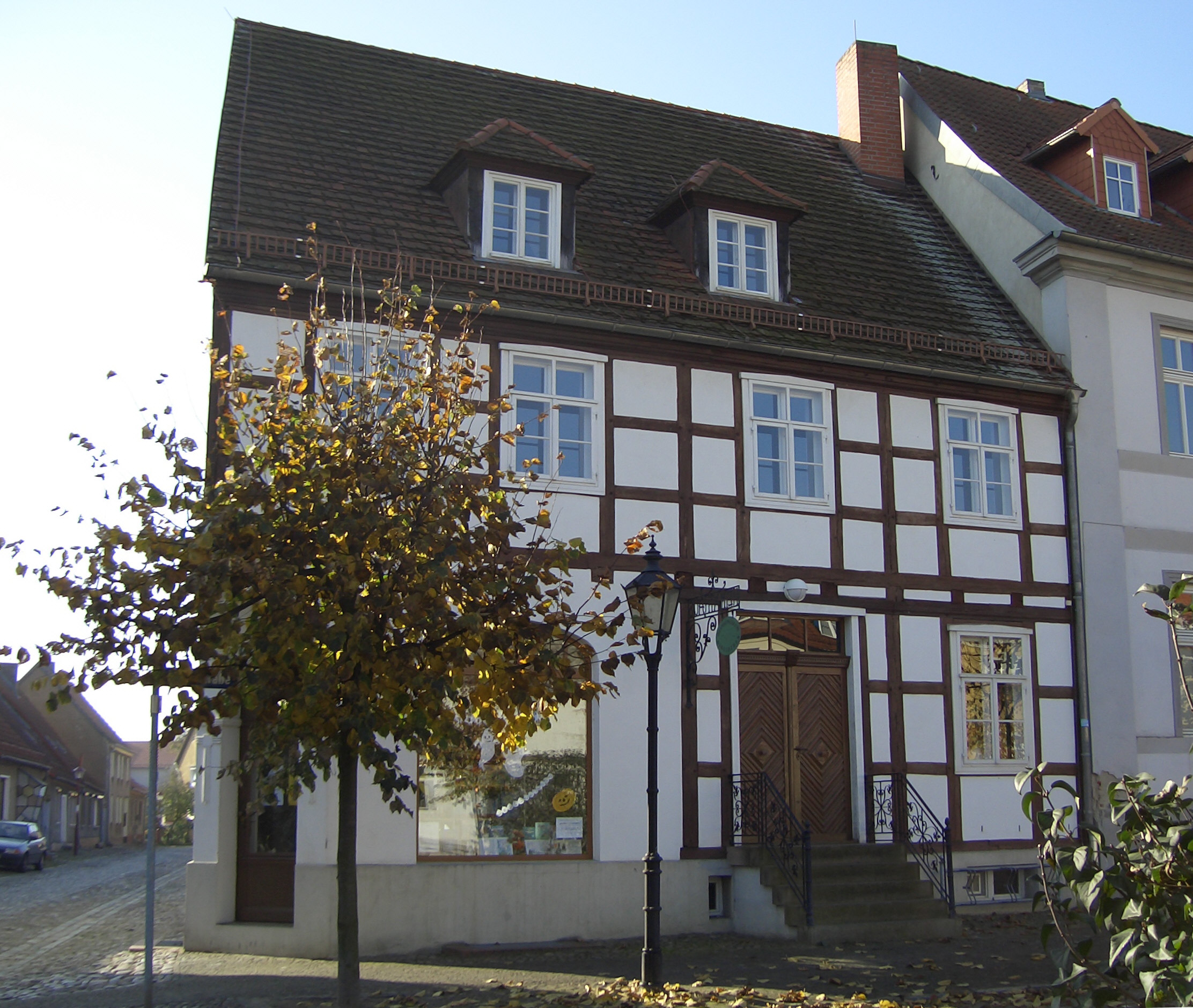
- Museum and library

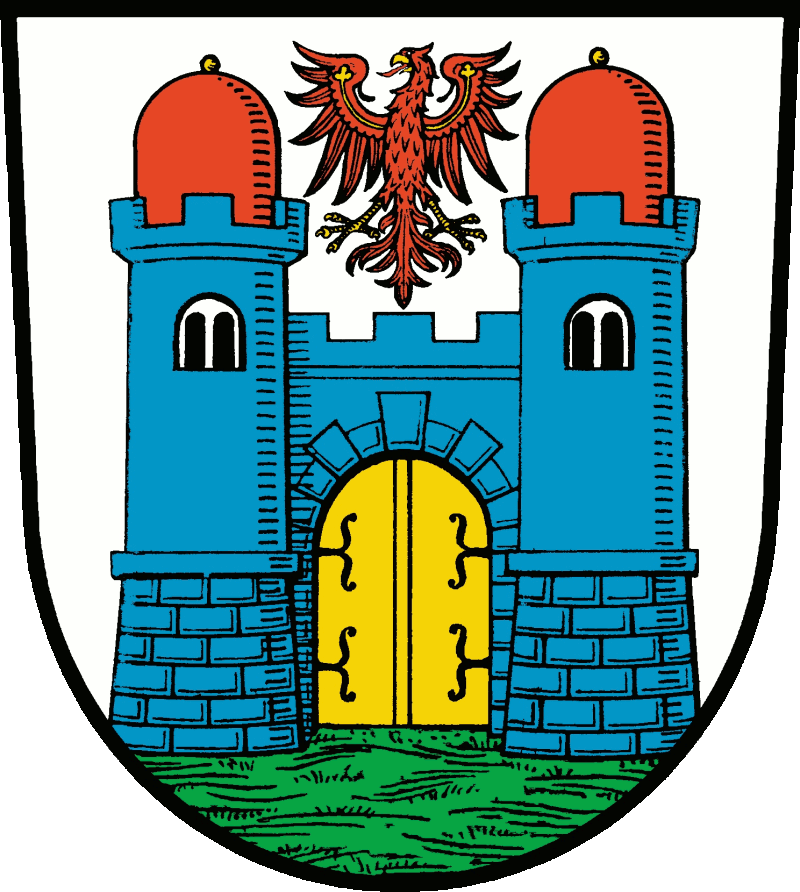
- Coat of arms

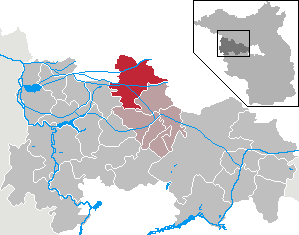
- Location of Friesack within Havelland district
- Interactive map of Friesack
- Location within Germany Location within Brandenburg
- Coordinates: 52°44′N 12°35′E
- Country: Germany
- State: Brandenburg
- District: Havelland
- Municipal assoc.: Friesack
- Subdivisions: 2 Ortsteile

Government
  - Mayor (2024–29): Lothar Schneider (SPD)

Area
  - Total: 84.01 km^{2} (32.44 sq mi)
- Elevation: 35 m (115 ft)

Population (2025-12-31)
  - Total: 2,525
  - Density: 30.06/km^{2} (77.84/sq mi)
- Time zone: UTC+01:00 (CET)
  - Summer (DST): UTC+02:00 (CEST)
- Postal codes: 14662
- Dialling codes: 033235
- Vehicle registration: HVL
- Website: www.amt-friesack.de

Friesack (German pronunciation: [ˈfʁiːzak]; also Friesack/Mark) is a town in the Havelland district, in Brandenburg, in north-eastern Germany. It is situated 22 km (14 mi) northeast of Rathenow, and 25 km (16 mi) southwest of Neuruppin. It is known for its Mesolithic archaeological site.

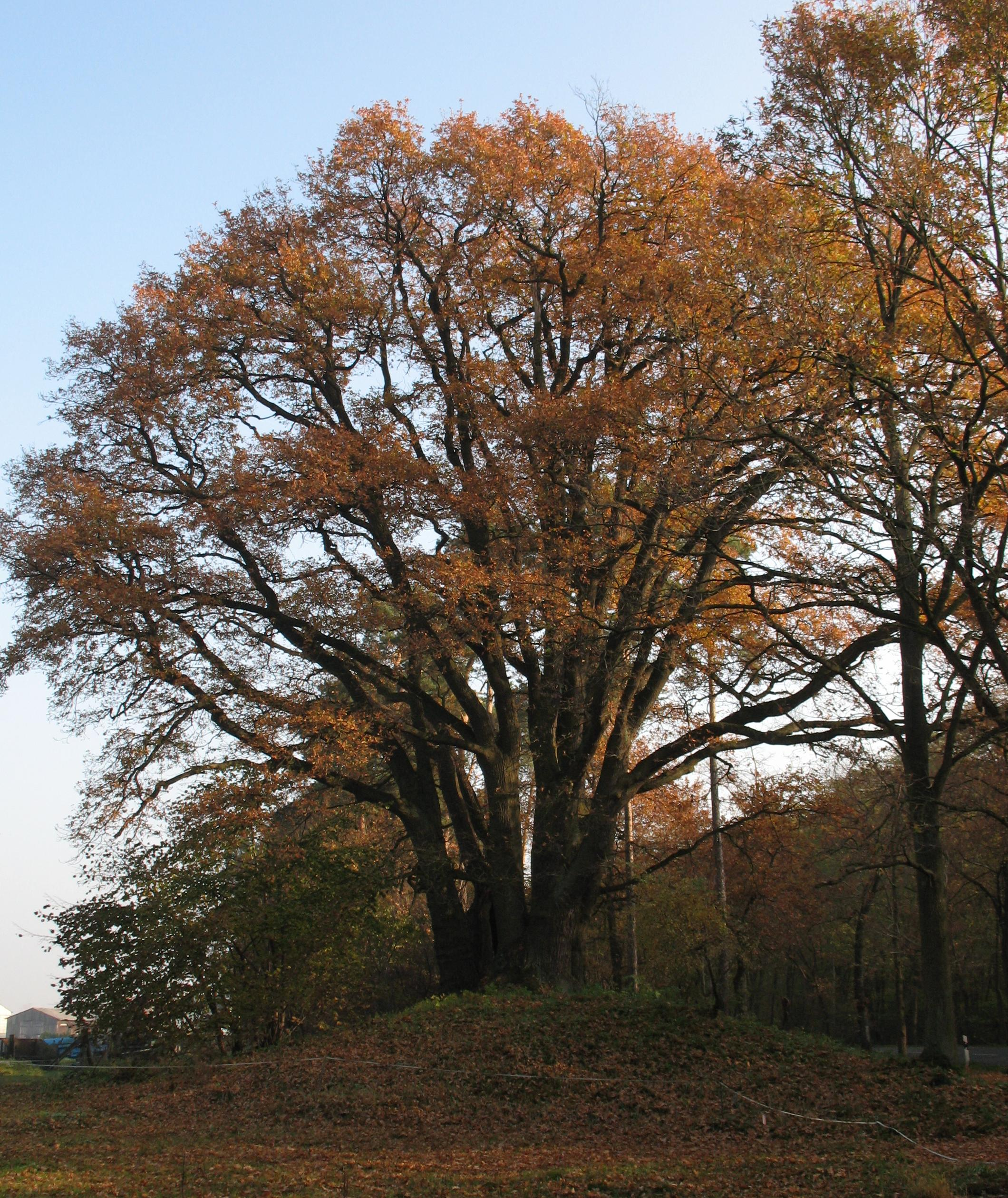
Seven Brothers Oak

== History ==
During World War II, in September 1943, the Oflag 8 prisoner-of-war camp was relocated from Frauenberg to Wutzetz, present-day district of Friesack. Polish, Greek, Bulgarian and Romanian officers were held in the camp before its dissolution in April 1945.

== Film shot in Friesack ==
- 1923 : Die Schlucht des Todes (The Ravine of Death) directed by Luciano Albertini and Albert-Francis Bertoni

== Demography ==
Development of population since 1875 within the current boundaries (Blue line: Population; Dotted line: Comparison to population development of Brandenburg state; Grey background: Time of Nazi rule; Red background: Time of communist rule)

Friesack: Population development
within the current boundaries (2017)

Year	Pop.	±% p.a.
1875	4,136	—
1890	4,057	−0.13%
1910	3,511	−0.72%
1925	3,447	−0.12%
1933	3,356	−0.33%
1939	3,539	+0.89%
1946	4,812	+4.49%
1950	4,640	−0.91%
1964	3,896	−1.24%
1971	3,719	−0.66%
1981	3,356	−1.02%
1985	3,243	−0.85%
1989	3,116	−0.99%
1990	3,003	−3.63%

Year	Pop.	±% p.a.
1991	2,972	−1.03%
1992	2,927	−1.51%
1993	2,889	−1.30%
1994	2,963	+2.56%
1995	2,921	−1.42%
1996	2,923	+0.07%
1997	2,979	+1.92%
1998	3,014	+1.17%
1999	3,000	−0.46%
2000	2,989	−0.37%
2001	2,953	−1.20%
2002	2,904	−1.66%
2003	2,859	−1.55%
2004	2,855	−0.14%

Year	Pop.	±% p.a.
2005	2,816	−1.37%
2006	2,781	−1.24%
2007	2,725	−2.01%
2008	2,670	−2.02%
2009	2,639	−1.16%
2010	2,541	−3.71%
2011	2,522	−0.75%
2012	2,484	−1.51%
2013	2,483	−0.04%
2014	2,546	+2.54%
2015	2,794	+9.74%
2016	2,560	−8.38%
2017	2,550	−0.39%

== Sons and daughters of the town ==
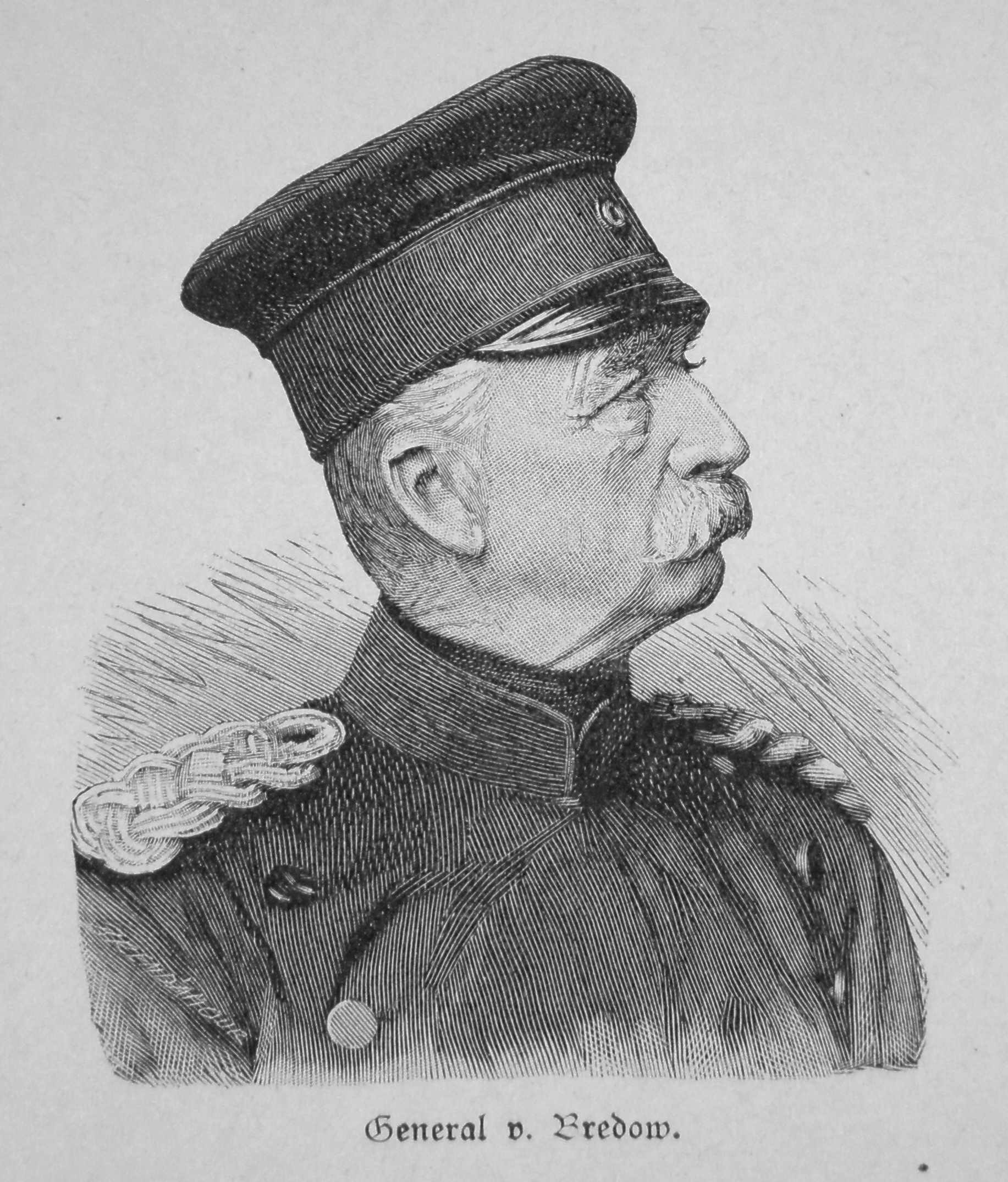
General von Bredow

- Emil Schallopp (1843-1919), chess master and writer
- Karsten Wettberg (born 1941), football coach
- Adalbert von Bredow (1814-1890), Prussian general
