= Paulinenaue =

- Municipality
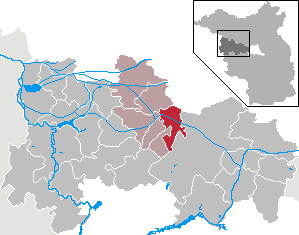
- Location of Paulinenaue within Havelland district
- Interactive map of Paulinenaue
- Location within Germany Location within Brandenburg
- Coordinates: 52°40′59″N 12°43′00″E
- Country: Germany
- State: Brandenburg
- District: Havelland
- Municipal assoc.: Friesack
- Subdivisions: 2 Ortsteile

Government
  - Mayor (2024–29): Arne Breder

Area
  - Total: 31.61 km^{2} (12.20 sq mi)
- Elevation: 31 m (102 ft)

Population (2025-12-31)
  - Total: 1,321
  - Density: 41.79/km^{2} (108.2/sq mi)
- Time zone: UTC+01:00 (CET)
  - Summer (DST): UTC+02:00 (CEST)
- Postal codes: 14641
- Dialling codes: 033237
- Vehicle registration: HVL

Paulinenaue is a municipality in the Havelland district, in Brandenburg, Germany.

== Demography ==
Development of population since 1875 within the current boundaries (Blue line: Population; Dotted line: Comparison to population development of Brandenburg state; Grey background: Time of Nazi rule; Red background: Time of communist rule)

Paulinenaue: Population development
within the current boundaries (2013)

Year	Pop.	±% p.a.
1875	496	—
1890	489	−0.09%
1910	624	+1.23%
1925	949	+2.83%
1933	1,080	+1.63%
1939	1,045	−0.55%
1946	1,548	+5.77%
1950	1,783	+3.60%
1964	1,452	−1.46%
1971	1,539	+0.83%
1981	1,544	+0.03%
1985	1,549	+0.08%
1989	1,564	+0.24%
1990	1,548	−1.02%
1991	1,516	−2.07%
1992	1,510	−0.40%
1993	1,520	+0.66%
1994	1,512	−0.53%
1995	1,511	−0.07%
1996	1,481	−1.99%

Year	Pop.	±% p.a.
1997	1,445	−2.43%
1998	1,452	+0.48%
1999	1,408	−3.03%
2000	1,394	−0.99%
2001	1,346	−3.44%
2002	1,347	+0.07%
2003	1,337	−0.74%
2004	1,331	−0.45%
2005	1,328	−0.23%
2006	1,310	−1.36%
2007	1,287	−1.76%
2008	1,271	−1.24%
2009	1,242	−2.28%
2010	1,209	−2.66%
2011	1,214	+0.41%
2012	1,209	−0.41%
2013	1,198	−0.91%
2014	1,233	+2.92%
2015	1,238	+0.41%
2016	1,255	+1.37%
