= Retzow =

- Municipality
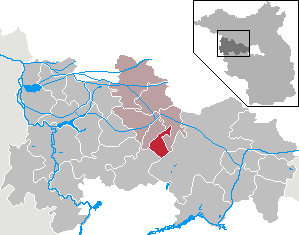
- Location of Retzow within Havelland district
- Interactive map of Retzow
- Location within Germany Location within Brandenburg
- Coordinates: 52°38′N 12°42′E
- Country: Germany
- State: Brandenburg
- District: Havelland
- Municipal assoc.: Friesack

Government
  - Mayor (2024–29): Christian Link

Area
  - Total: 14.84 km^{2} (5.73 sq mi)
- Elevation: 39 m (128 ft)

Population (2025-12-31)
  - Total: 495
  - Density: 33.4/km^{2} (86.4/sq mi)
- Time zone: UTC+01:00 (CET)
  - Summer (DST): UTC+02:00 (CEST)
- Postal codes: 14641
- Dialling codes: 033237
- Vehicle registration: HVL
- Website: www.amt-friesack.de

Retzow (German pronunciation: [ˈʁɛtsoː]) is a municipality in the Havelland district, in Brandenburg, Germany.

== Demography ==
Development of population since 1875 within the current boundaries (Blue line: Population; Dotted line: Comparison to population development of Brandenburg state; Grey background: Time of Nazi rule; Red background: Time of communist rule)

Retzow: Population development
within the current boundaries (2013)

Year	Pop.	±% p.a.
1875	537	—
1890	540	+0.04%
1910	562	+0.20%
1925	642	+0.89%
1933	573	−1.41%
1939	503	−2.15%
1946	1,000	+10.31%
1950	966	−0.86%
1964	696	−2.31%
1971	675	−0.44%
1981	554	−1.96%
1985	573	+0.85%
1989	569	−0.17%
1990	563	−1.05%
1991	584	+3.73%
1992	569	−2.57%
1993	577	+1.41%
1994	582	+0.87%
1995	588	+1.03%
1996	603	+2.55%

Year	Pop.	±% p.a.
1997	600	−0.50%
1998	587	−2.17%
1999	586	−0.17%
2000	586	+0.00%
2001	600	+2.39%
2002	606	+1.00%
2003	602	−0.66%
2004	591	−1.83%
2005	585	−1.02%
2006	580	−0.85%
2007	573	−1.21%
2008	571	−0.35%
2009	562	−1.58%
2010	568	+1.07%
2011	552	−2.82%
2012	527	−4.53%
2013	529	+0.38%
2014	518	−2.08%
2015	518	+0.00%
2016	511	−1.35%
