= Havelland (district) =

Coordinates: 52°38′N 12°38′E

- District
- Flag Coat of arms
- Country: Germany
- State: Brandenburg
- Capital: Rathenow

Government
  - District admin.: Roger Lewandowski (CDU)

Area
  - Total: 1,717 km^{2} (663 sq mi)

Population (31 December 2025)
  - Total: 170,792
  - Density: 99.47/km^{2} (257.6/sq mi)
- Time zone: UTC+01:00 (CET)
  - Summer (DST): UTC+02:00 (CEST)
- Vehicle registration: HVL, NAU, RN
- Website: http://www.havelland.de

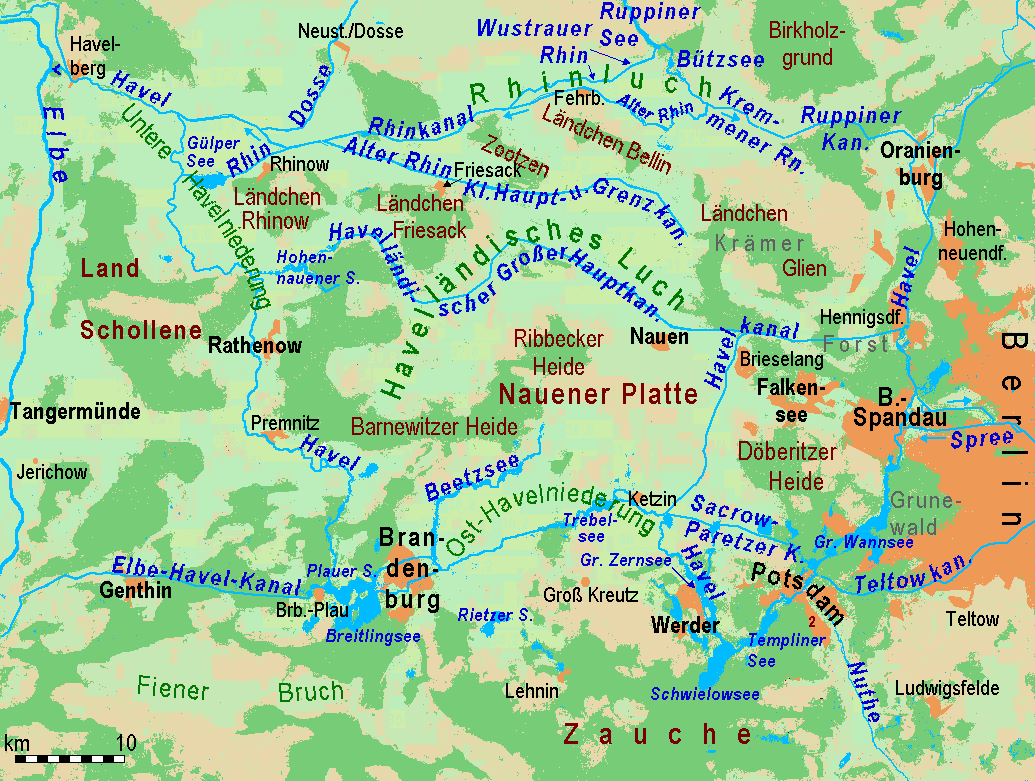
yellowish green = less than 40 meters above sea level, brown = more than 45 m above sea level, green = forests, mostly more than 45 m above sea level

Havelland (German pronunciation: [ˈhaːfəlˌlant]) is a district or county in Brandenburg, Germany. It is bounded by (from the north and clockwise) the districts of Ostprignitz-Ruppin and Oberhavel, the city-state of Berlin, the district of Potsdam-Mittelmark, the city of Brandenburg and the state of Saxony-Anhalt (districts of Jerichower Land and Stendal).

== History ==
The district was established in 1993 by merging the former districts of Nauen and Rathenow.

== Demography ==
Development of Population since 1875 within the Current Boundaries (Blue Line: Population; Dotted Line: Comparison to Population Development of Brandenburg state)

Recent Population Development and Projections (Population Development before Census 2011 (blue line); Recent Population Development according to the Census in Germany in 2011 (blue bordered line); Official projections for 2005-2030 (yellow line); for 2014-2030 (red line); for 2017-2030 (scarlet line)

Landkreis Havelland: Population development
within the current boundaries (2025)

Year	Pop.	±% p.a.
1875	68,310	—
1890	78,689	+0.95%
1910	93,714	+0.88%
1925	108,499	+0.98%
1933	119,395	+1.20%
1939	142,609	+3.01%
1946	170,907	+2.62%
1950	169,878	−0.15%
1964	148,834	−0.94%
1971	150,101	+0.12%

Year	Pop.	±% p.a.
1981	141,667	−0.58%
1985	139,178	−0.44%
1990	132,710	−0.95%
1995	131,821	−0.13%
2000	149,285	+2.52%
2005	155,019	+0.76%
2010	154,891	−0.02%
2015	158,236	+0.43%
2020	164,693	+0.80%
2025	170,792	+0.73%

== Geography ==
Geographically the Havelland refers to the land either side of the Havel river and the area surrounded by the large "U" bend in its course between the city of Berlin and its confluence with the Elbe river. The district mainly consists of the areas north of the Havel river.

== Coat of arms ==
District banner of Havelland

The red eagle is the heraldic animal of Brandenburg. The head of the eagle is part of the coat of arms of Rathenow. The swan is often used as a symbol for the Havelland region.

== Towns and municipalities ==
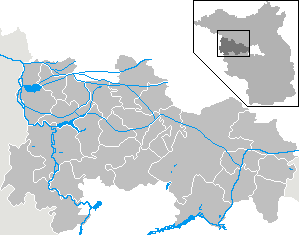
Clickable map of towns and municipalities in the district

Amt-free towns	Ämter
1. Falkensee; 2. Ketzin; 3. Nauen; 4. Premnitz; 5. Rathenow; Amt-free municipalities: 1. Brieselang; 2. Dallgow-Döberitz; 3. Milower Land; 4. Schönwalde-Glien; 5. Wustermark	1. Friesack; 1. Friesack^{1, 2}; 2. Mühlenberge; 3. Paulinenaue; 4. Pessin; 5. Retzow; 6. Wiesenaue; 2. Nennhausen; 1. Kotzen; 2. Märkisch Luch; 3. Nennhausen^{1}; 4. Stechow-Ferchesar	3. Rhinow; 1. Gollenberg; 2. Großderschau; 3. Havelaue; 4. Kleßen-Görne; 5. Rhinow^{1, 2}; 6. Seeblick
^{1}seat of the Amt; ^{2}town
