= Ländchen (Havelland) =

Ice Age plateaux in the Havelland region

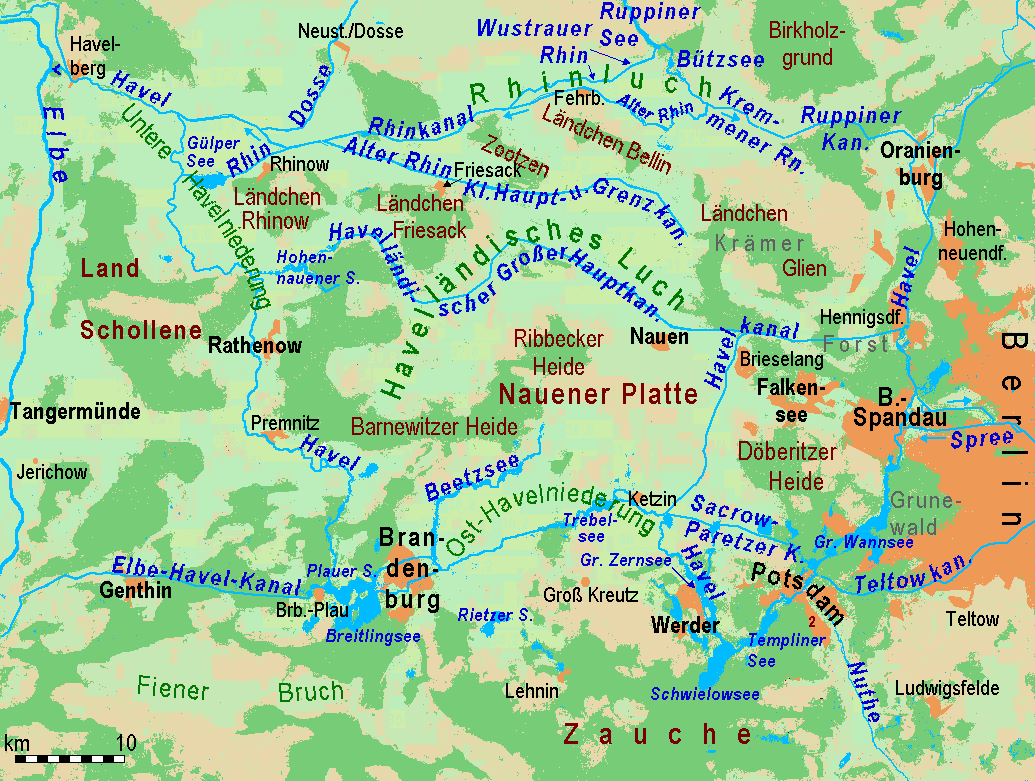
The Ländchen and Luche of the Havelland; elevations only shown for open terrain; hills and plateaux are in red-brown, lowlands in green

A Ländchen (German pronunciation: [ˈlɛntçən], literally "little land" or "little country") is the German name given to several Ice Age plateaux in the Havelland region, which climb to over 70 metres above the formerly marshy urstromtal levels (old glacial meltwater valleys) of the Havelland Luch and the Rhinluch. The difference between these Ländchen and the surrounding countryside is even more marked because of the different land uses to which they are put. Extensive pastures in the lowlands contrast with the arable fields and woods on the low hills. Geologically they are largely complete formations of ground moraine from the Saale and Weichselian glaciations that, in places, are covered by gently rolling end moraines.

Their names are:

- Ländchen Bellin near Fehrbellin (52.78°N 12.79°E)
- Ländchen Friesack near Friesack (52.70°N 12.56°E)
- Ländchen Glien near Paaren im Glien north of Falkensee (52.68°N 13.05°E)
- Ländchen Rhinow near Rhinow near the confluence of the Rhin and the Havel (52.72°N 12.35°E)
- Land Schollene between Havel and the Elbe valley, west of Rathenow (52.63°N 12.16°E)
- Ribbeck Heath, part of the Nauen Plateau (52.60°N 12.73°E)
- Zootzen north of Friesack, scarcely higher than the Luche (52.76°N 12.67°E)

== Sources ==
Topographic map, 1:100,000 series, Sheets C 3538 Brandenburg an der Havel and C 3542 Berlin West, both from LGB Brandenburg
