= Bullengraben =

Tributary of the Havel

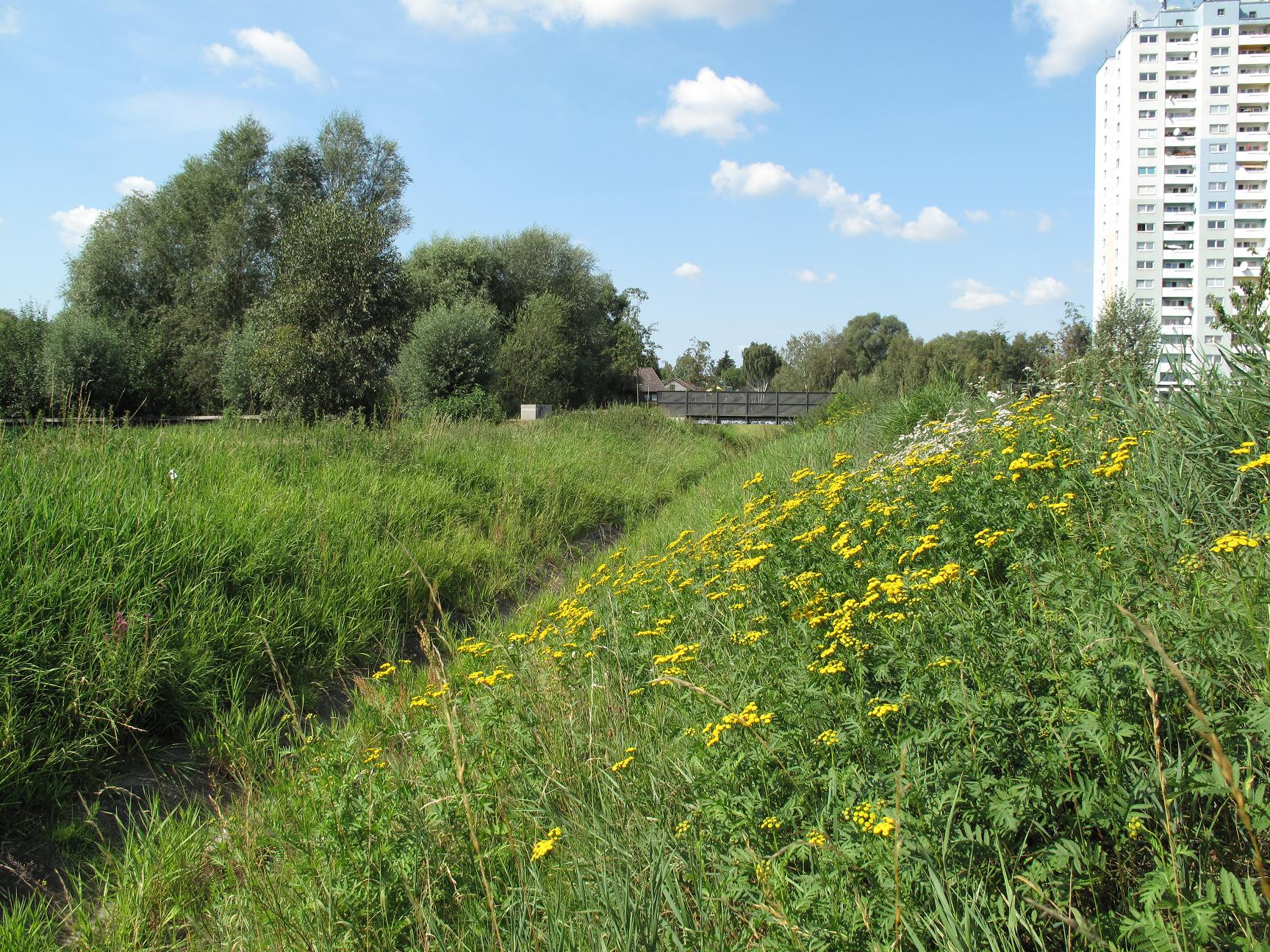
- The Bullengraben at Grabenkreuz, 2009

Location
- Country: Germany
- City: Berlin
- District: Spandau
- Localities: Staaken, Wilhelmstadt

Physical characteristics
- Source
  - location: Altstaaken, at the former Staaken-West Hospital
  - coordinates: 52°31′55″N 13°8′16″E
  - elevation: 32 m (105 ft)
- Mouth: In Wilhelmstadt between Schulen and Dischinger bridges piped into the Havel
  - coordinates: 52°31′45″N 13°11′59″E
- Length: 4.5 km (2.8 mi)

Basin features
- River system: Elbe
- Tributaries
  - left: Stieglake ditch, Neustaakener ditch
  - right: Ramingraben/Amalienhofgraben, Egelpfuhl ditch
- Channelized drainage ditch. Between 2004–2007 the Bullengraben green area was renovated and renatured.

The Bullengraben is a ditch in Berlin's glacial valley, which has been in use since the 7th century. It is located in the Berlin district of Spandau and runs from the old village center of Staaken eastwards for about five kilometers to the Havel River, into which it flows north of the Spandau castle rampart. Used for centuries to improve the wetlands, since the 1960s it has been used as a drainage ditch to collect rainwater from the surrounding neighborhoods of Spandau.

Between 2004 and 2007, DB ProjektBau reactivated a ditch that had been canalized in the 1960s and 1970s but had later been neglected. This reactivation was conducted as part of a replacement measure. Parallel to the moat, the Deutsche Bahn subsidiary created the 200-meter-wide green corridor with playgrounds and sports fields, recreational areas, bridges, footbridges, and a path that leads to Elsflether Weg. The Bullengrabenweg, one of Berlin's top 20 green paths, is open to pedestrians, cyclists, and skaters. The path is approximately four meters wide and has a smooth asphalt covering. The last section of the path includes the Burgwallgraben and a 100-metre-long promenade along the Havel. Additionally, biotopes located within the green corridor, such as the Stieglake and Wiesen basins, along with the ditches leading to them, such as the Egelpfuhlgraben, have undergone restoration. In 2008, Deutsche Bahn received the Gustav Meyer Prize for designing the park. This award is given every two years since 1995 to recognize excellent planning of public green spaces and parks.

== Overview ==
The Bullengraben stretches between Heerstraße and the Brunsbütteler Dam. It starts in the northwest of the Altstaaken village church at the old Staaken-West hospital, although it is hardly noticeable and has become overgrown for the first few meters of its length. The Bullengraben Green Corridor, a recently established site, is located approximately one hundred meters towards the east at Nennhauser Dam. A metallic bridge provides access to the lowland which leads to a small settling basin that is considered a symbol of the source of the Bullengraben. The ditch and green corridor later stretch towards the eastern direction, spreading over approximately 4.5 kilometers. In Staaken, it passes the Staakener fields and the Louise-Schroeder estate. The green corridor departs from Staaken at the intersection of the Egelpfuhlgraben and Neustaakener Graben. It serves as the boundary between the Spandau (to the north) and Wilhelmstadt (to the south) districts up to the Havel, where the district border follows both sides of the ditch. The ditch eventually leads to Elsflether Weg, passing through Klosterfeld, new housing developments, and allotment gardens in the Spandau district, before reaching the old housing developments around Klosterstrasse. A total of 17 bridges cross the Bullengraben, including several smaller wooden or metal footbridges connecting allotments and neighboring settlements.

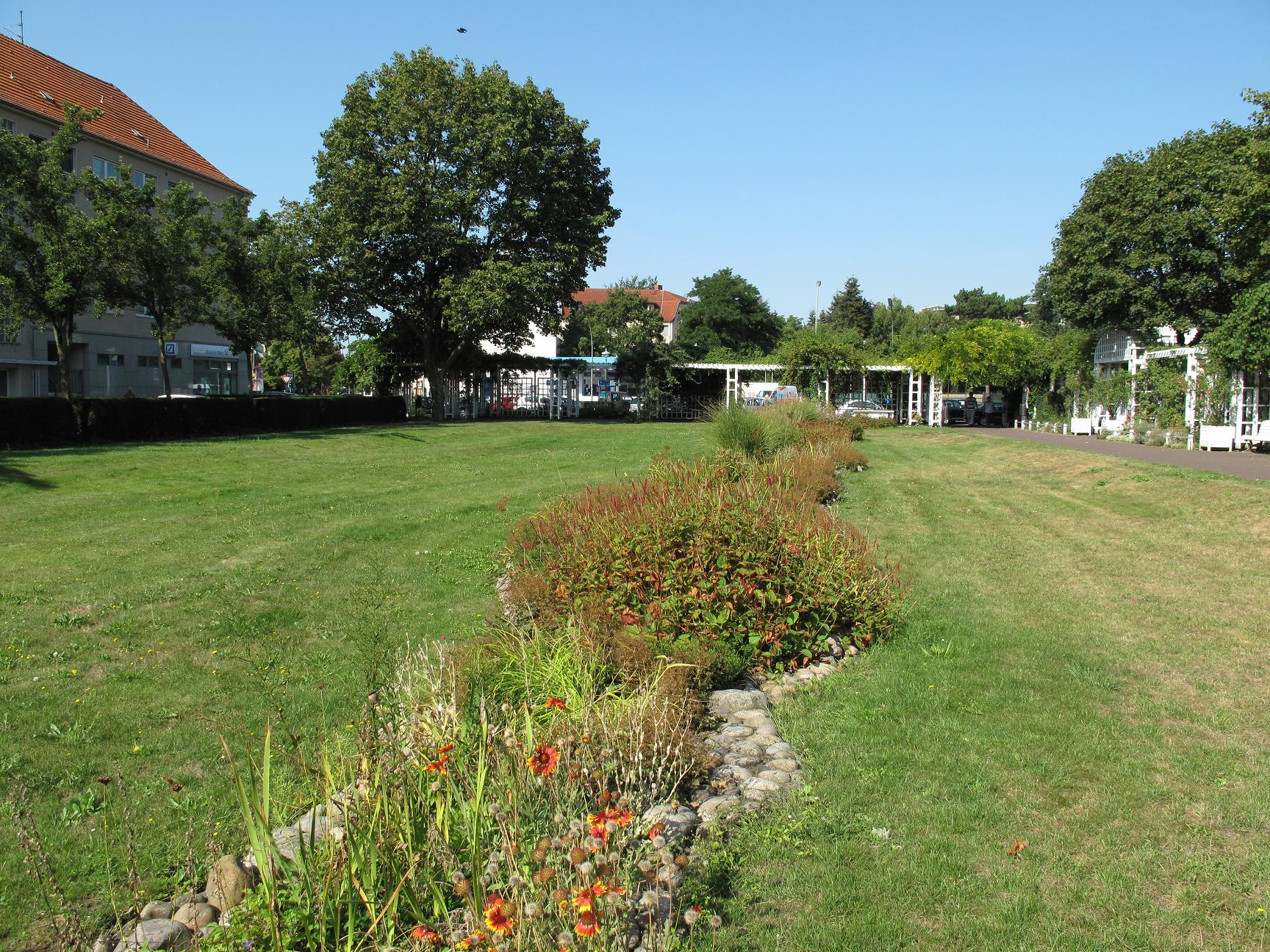
Green area at Ziegelhof

Beyond the Elsflether Weg, the ditch and green corridor continue east for about 50 meters before ending at the back of the large Klosterstrasse development. At this point, the ditch subsequently runs underground towards the Havel. To the east of Klosterstrasse, the pipes are located beneath the Grünanlage am Ziegelhof, which proceeds straight to the Havel. The green corridor is interrupted but resumes to the southeast at Ziegelhof Street, following the Burgwallgraben which begins at this point and reaches the Havel River after about 300 meters in a semicircular path.

== Geology and location ==
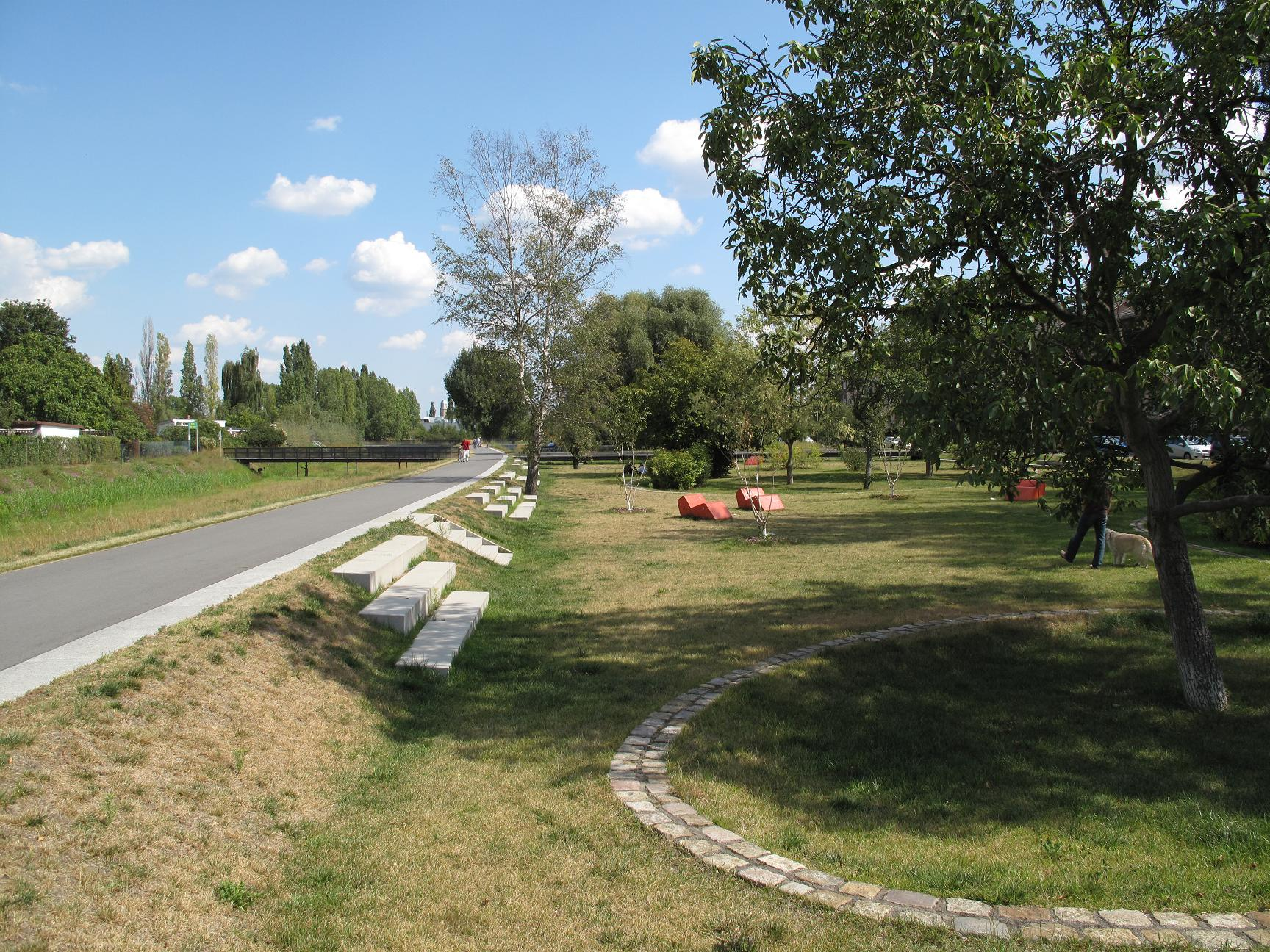
Green area with Bullengraben (left) and sunken garden

The Bullengraben lowland was formed from a previous flow channel located within the Weichsel glacial valley of Berlin. Currently, the Bullengraben flows in a direction against the original flow of the valley, from west to east, into the Havel channel. This channel, which crosses part of the glacial valley, finally discharges into the Havel about 800 meters south of the Spree. The valley is made up of substantial sand deposits that exceed 20 meters in depth. After the end of the Ice Age, soil rich in peat and limestone meadow deposits developed to the west of the Havel channel due to alluvial sedimentation processes. In contrast, the Spree flows through and drains the eastern part of the glacial valley in its natural direction of flow, whereas the western part of the Havel lacks significant rivers. The large lowland area was previously very wet and frequently flooded but was eventually drained into the Havel through ditches like the Bullengraben and the Spekte. These ditches flowed parallel to the Bullengraben, approximately one kilometer to the north. The northern slope of the Nauen Plateau, which borders the glacial valley here to the south, lies on average around one kilometer away from the Bullengraben.

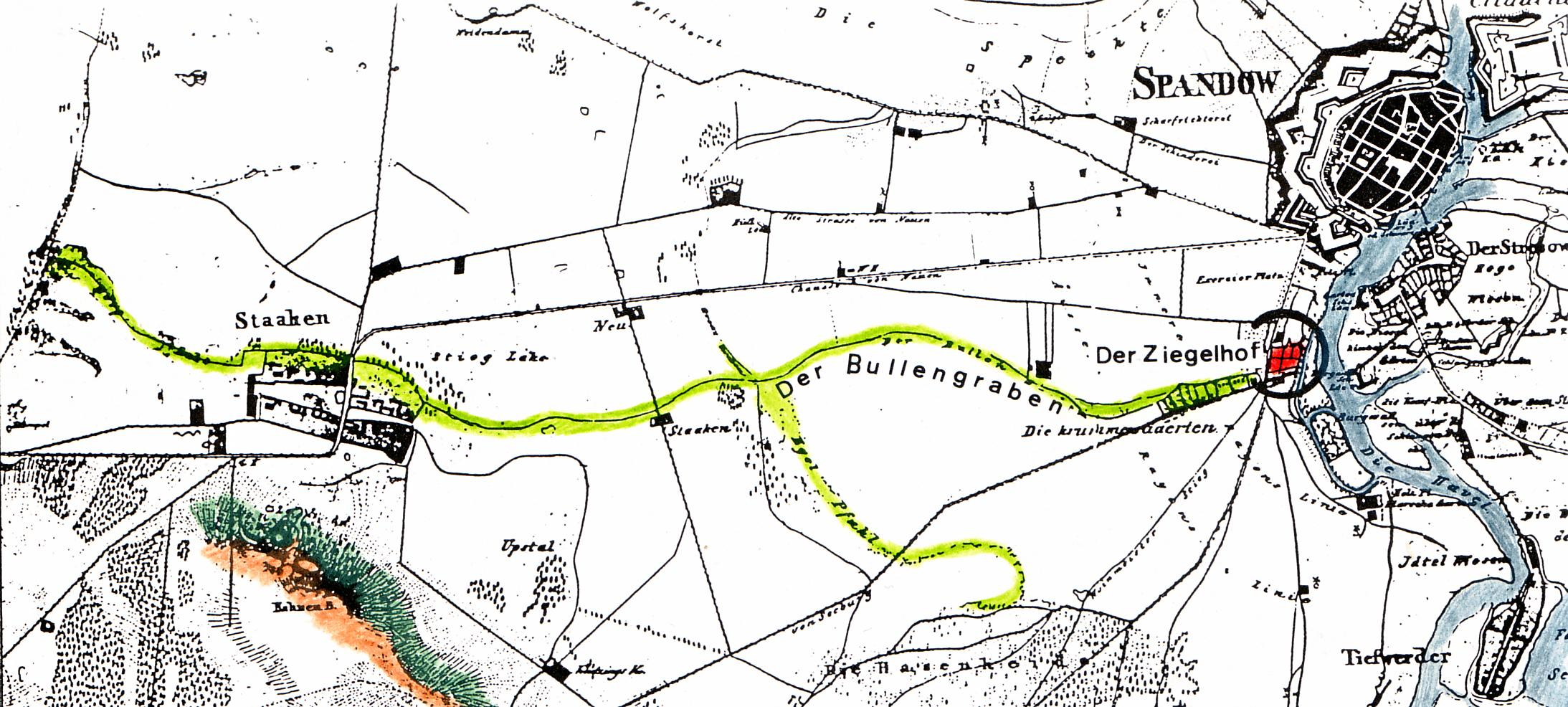
Bullengraben valley, Egelpfuhl, Ziegelhof and Burgwallinsel on a map from 1836. The green-brown areas mark former vineyards on the northern slope of the Nauen Plateau.

== History of the Bullengraben and its settlement ==
=== Early melioration ditch and etymology ===
The Bullengraben, which was most likely artificially created in a glacial flow channel, has been used since the Slavic settlement of Havelland in the 7th century, to effectively improve the wet lowlands west of Havel. This resulted in the possibility of pasture and hay farming. The name of the channel is believed to have originated from the Slavic term for hay bales. Another account suggests that the name arose from the channel's use as a watering trough for bulls. It is said that the Bullengraben and the Spekte were connected to the Elbe through a nearly uninterrupted canal network that extended to Nauen and the Havelland Luch. However, Winfried Schich has cast doubt on these claims, stating that there is no evidence to support them:

"In Spandau, archaeologists believe they can reconstruct further canalized waterways beyond the Havel and Spree in the course of the Spekte and Bullengraben lowlands leading westwards. The historian can say just as little about this as he can about the question of whether the Mark Brandenburg cultural landscape with its numerous ditches and ramparts was even the legacy of a Bronze Age colonization with an agricultural irrigation system, as Klaus Goldmann believes. The tangle of natural and artificial watercourses dug at various times in the Mark is not easy to unravel in terms of its genesis."

— Winfried Schich: Die Havel als Wasserstraße im Mittelalter: Brücken, Dämme, Mühlen, Flutrinnen. 1992.

=== Former estuary at the Slavic settlement ===
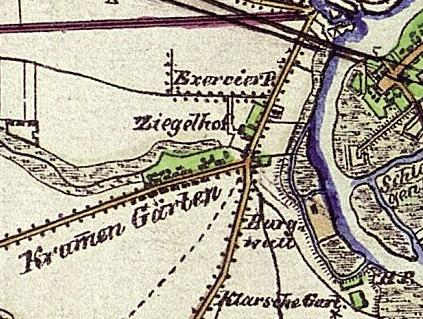
The mouth of the Bullengraben into the still complete Burgwallgraben on a map from 1842

Up until the mid-19th century, the Bullengraben flowed into the northern section of the Burgwallgraben, which curved around the Burgwall Island in a semicircle. However, due to the construction of the Berlin-Hamburg railway, this part of the Burgwallgraben was filled in around 1870. There is no longer any connection between the Bullengraben and the southern remains of the Burgwallgraben. The Burgwall Island, which was one of the biggest archaeological excavation sites in Berlin/Brandenburg at the end of the 20th century, served as the focal point of the Slavic settlement chamber of Spandau. Apart from this central castle, there was an additional Old Slavic settlement on the Bullengraben between the 8th and 10th centuries, which is now known as Cosmarweg.

=== Klosterfeld and Ziegelhof ===
The village of Stakene (Staaken), first mentioned in a document in 1273, was established at the source of the Bullengraben as part of the German settlement in the east. In the first half of the 13th century, the Ascanian margraves founded the Benedictine convent of St. Marien, and extensive farmyard in the estuary area. Until the dissolution of the convent in 1590, the Benedictine nuns cultivated their arable gardens on the land located in front of the convent gate between the Bullengraben, Burgwallgraben, and Havel. They possessed 60 hectares of arable land, which was 11.5 hectares more than the town of Spandau's field area. The Krummen Gärten ("Crooked Gardens"), situated directly on the Bullengraben, were also part of their possession. These gardens have been recorded on old maps. Nine small houses were laid out at Krummen Gärten in the 15th century, likely becoming the first residential buildings in the area outside of Staaken, the monastery, and Spandau city walls. Around 1580, Rochus zu Lynar, the master builder of the citadel, obtained the nuns' farmland and began growing wine on the site.

After demolishing the old brick kiln on Stresow, Elector Georg Wilhelm commissioned the construction of a new council brickwork on the former monastery grounds in Spandau. The new brickworks included a kiln, a brick barn, and four lime barns, which were completed in 1676. Outflanked by the emerging brick-making centers of Glindow and Werder, the town demolished the brick kiln in 1755 and replaced it with a fruit tree plantation. The area experienced frequent flooding from the nearby Havel and Bullengraben rivers, leading the tenants to adopt an agricultural and gardening lifestyle. The area was part of the Klosterfeld and the Potsdamer Vorstadt, which formed the 8th district of Spandau from 1872. The development of the areas around the former Ziegelhof began in 1867 with the creation of Wilhelmstadt.

=== 1811 Flooding Act and piping ===
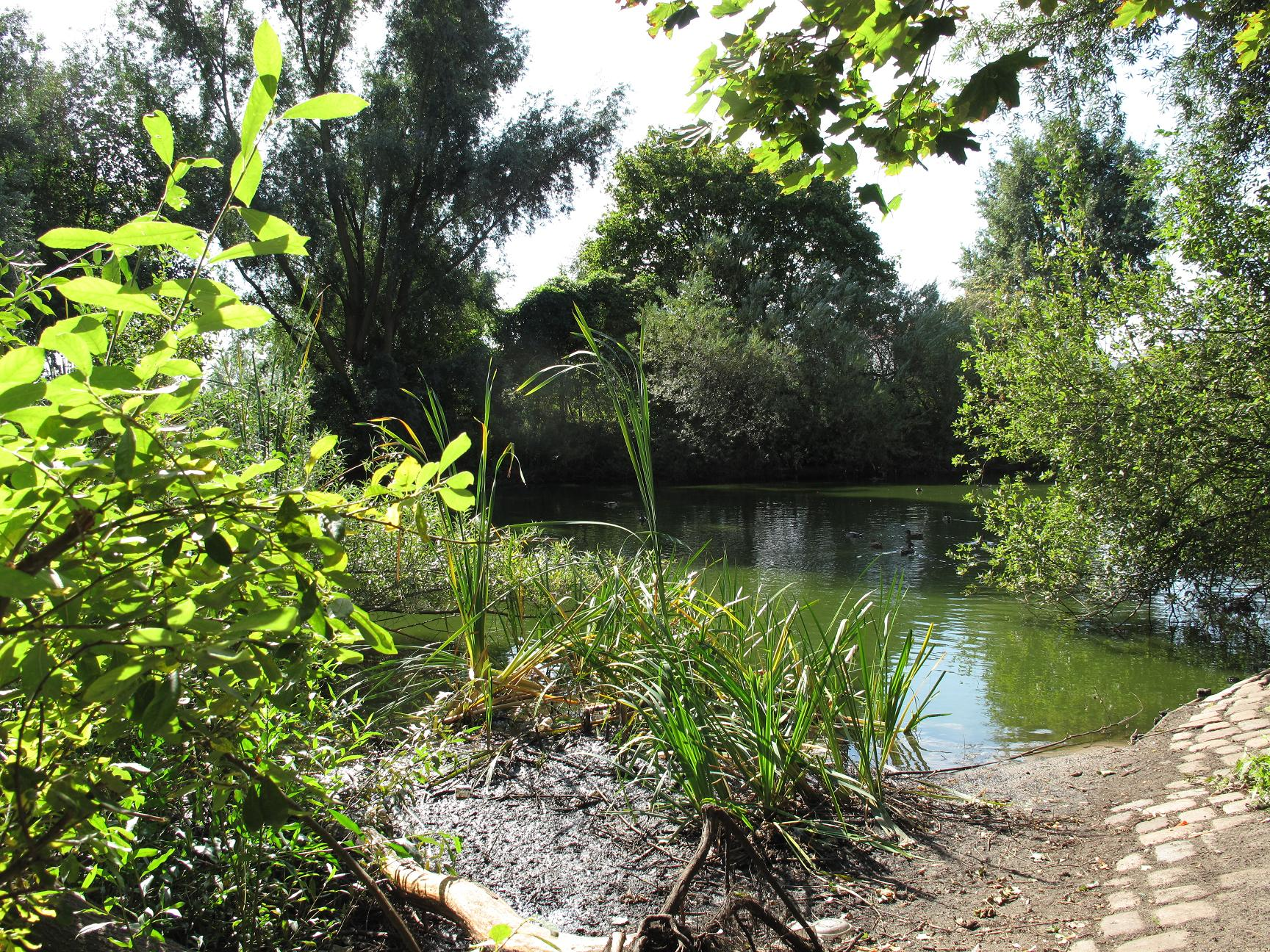
Stieglake Basin (retention basin) created in the 1960s, 2009

To maintain clear and free-flowing ditches, Prussia implemented a law before the floods in 1811. The legislation required residents to clear the ditches every spring and autumn. The law was emphasized in public announcements:

"The owners of properties in the Amts-Closterfelde, who are obliged as adjacents to clear the Bullengraben, are hereby requested to clear the said ditch this year by October 1st at the latest. at the latest. Should the clearing not have been carried out by this date, we will arrange for it to be done at the expense of the defaulters."

— Royal Domain Rent Office. Announcement. Spandau, August 19, 1863

Despite preventive measures, extensive flooding occurred around 1870, stretching from the Havel across Klosterstraße (then known as Potsdamer Chaussee) to the Egelpfuhlwiesen. The primary cause for this was the inadequate water supply in the Burgwallgraben, which had been filled in during railway construction. Consequently, the northern section of the Burgwallgraben was filled and the Bullengraben was diverted into the Havel.

=== Canalization and change of function in the 20th century ===
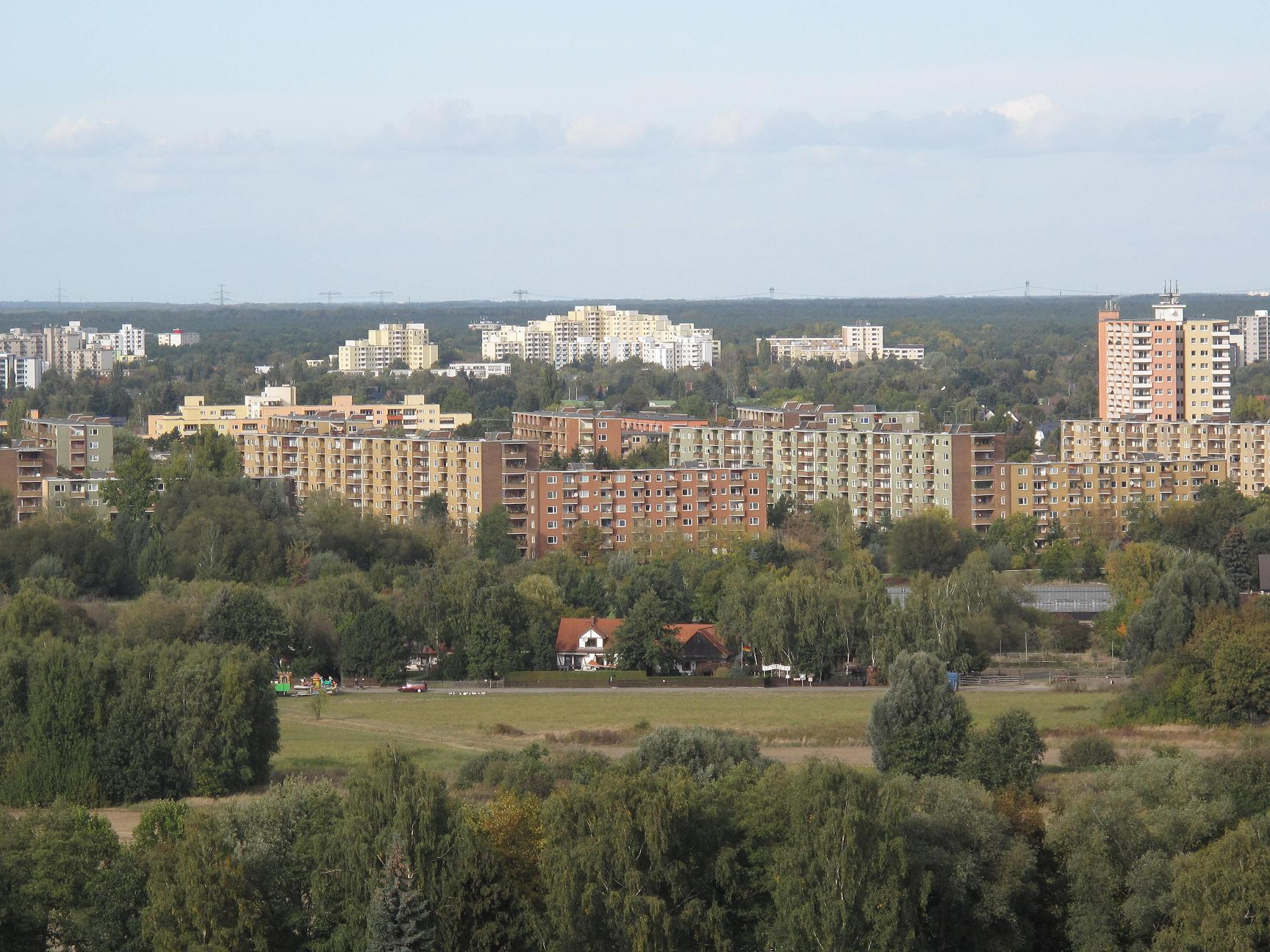
View from Hahneberg to the Bullengraben lowlands and the Louise Schroeder settlement in Staaken, 2009

The development of the meadows around the ditch started at the beginning of the 20th century. After the construction of the Staaken airfield in 1915, the ditch lost its function as a floodplain for the Staaken fields. Until the 1960s, the area around the ditch remained largely undisturbed in its development and use as meadowland. The Bullengraben lowland was permanently altered by large-scale embankments for the development of the Klosterfeld meadows and adjacent areas. In the 1960s and 1970s, the ditch was converted and expanded into a drainage ditch and canalized to collect the rainwater running off the surface. Three retention basins were created: Stieglake, Wiesen, and Ulriken. Due to the construction of large housing estates and the increased pumping of drinking water from the Spandau waterworks, the groundwater level of the Bullengraben lowlands dropped, causing the vegetation of the lowlands to change considerably.

In the Staakener fields, the Bullengraben flowed parallel to the inner-German border of Staaken, which was divided between 1951 and 1990, on West Berlin territory. The ditch was entirely overgrown and its lower regions were neglected during the 1980s and 1990s. After the reunification of Germany, additional urban neighborhoods were linked to the Bullengraben drainage network.

== Hydrology and ecology before rehabilitation and renaturation ==
All data on hydrology and ecology refer to studies conducted prior to the restoration and renaturation of the green corridor, which was completed in 2007. Information on the effects of the measures on the water balance and biotope quality as well as specific data on the "ecological improvement" carried out (see below) are not available.

=== Catchment area and stormwater drainage ===
In 1977, the Bullengraben lowland's groundwater level was between the groundwater contour lines of 28.0 and 29.0 meters above sea level. Subsequently, the groundwater level continuously declined and hit a minimum of 3.4 to 4.3 meters below ground level by 1978 once canalization was performed. In 1989, the groundwater level was approximately 1.5 to 1.8 meters lower than it had been 20 to 30 years prior. The discharge of rainwater into the sewage system was established using data from the Informationssystem Stadt und Umwelt Berlin (Information System City and Environment Berlin) (ISU), using the Federal Institute of Hydrology's ABIMO program (water balance model). In 2004, the first receiving water bodies' catchment areas were in the Green Corridor region.

Catchment area and storm drain
| | Bullengraben | Stieglake-dig | Stieglake basin | Wiesenbecken | Neustaakener Graben | Burgwall- graben |
|---|---|---|---|---|---|---|
| Catchment area m^{2} | 1,384,220 | 62,975 | 132,515 | 592,658 | 85,125 | 55,517 |
| Rain runoff m^{3}/a (annual runoff volume) | 174,818 | 8,018 | 19,713 | 67,025 | 5,422 | 6,082 |

This leads to a drainage basin of 1.4 km^{2} for the Bullengraben and 2.3 km^{2} for the entire green corridor with its associated tributaries (data basis status: December 2001, data status: August 30, 2004).

=== Water structure quality of the Bullengraben 2003 ===
In 2003, a water quality mapping using the on-site method revealed severe anthropogenic damage to the Bullengraben with an average overall rating of excessively damaged (quality class 7 on a scale of one to seven).

=== Protected biotopes and protected green space ===
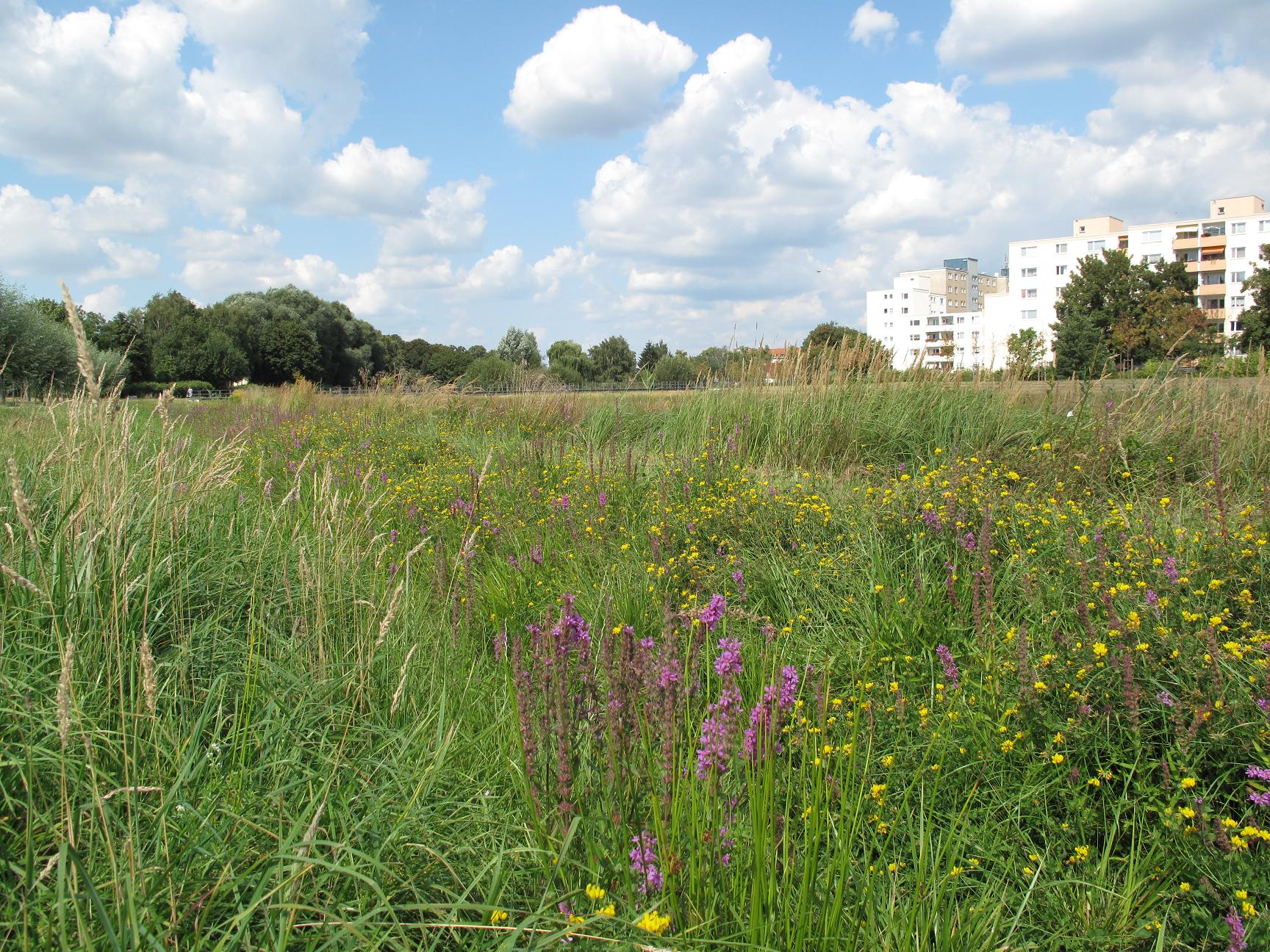
Wet meadow at Bullengraben in Staaken

The Bullengraben is listed as a connecting biotope for species of wet and damp habitats, including wet and damp meadows, swamp forests, ditches, and lakes, by the Berlin Landscape and Species Conservation Program.

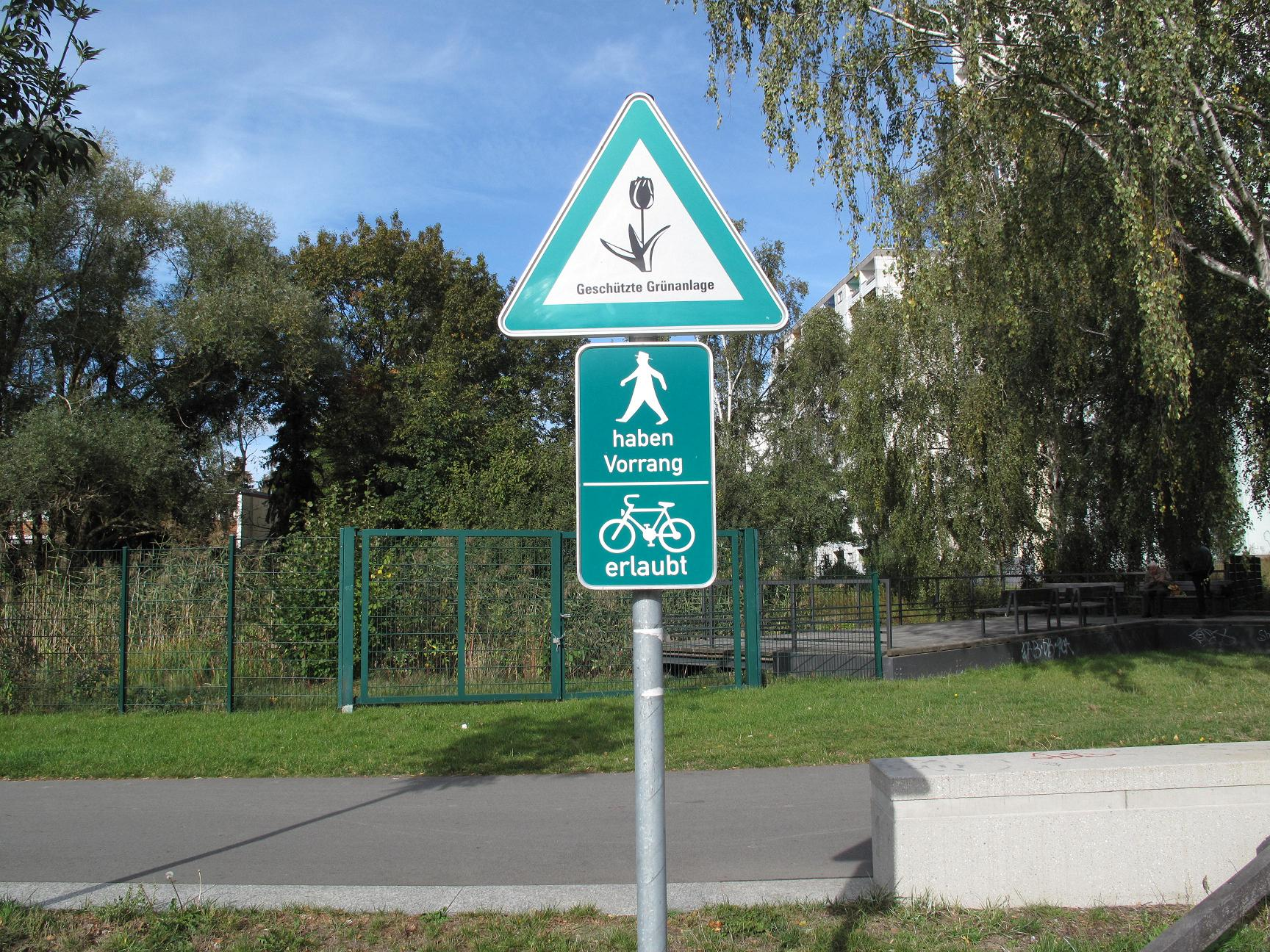
Tulip “Protected green area” sign on a platform towards the meadow pool

As of July 1995, the Senate Department for Urban Development listed the biotopes in the Bullengraben and Egelpfuhlgraben area that are legally protected under Section 30a (now under Section 26a).

The Bullengraben Green Corridor opened in 2007, and all its branches are listed as protected green spaces under the Berlin Green Spaces Act. The protected status is indicated by numerous signs with a tulip symbol.

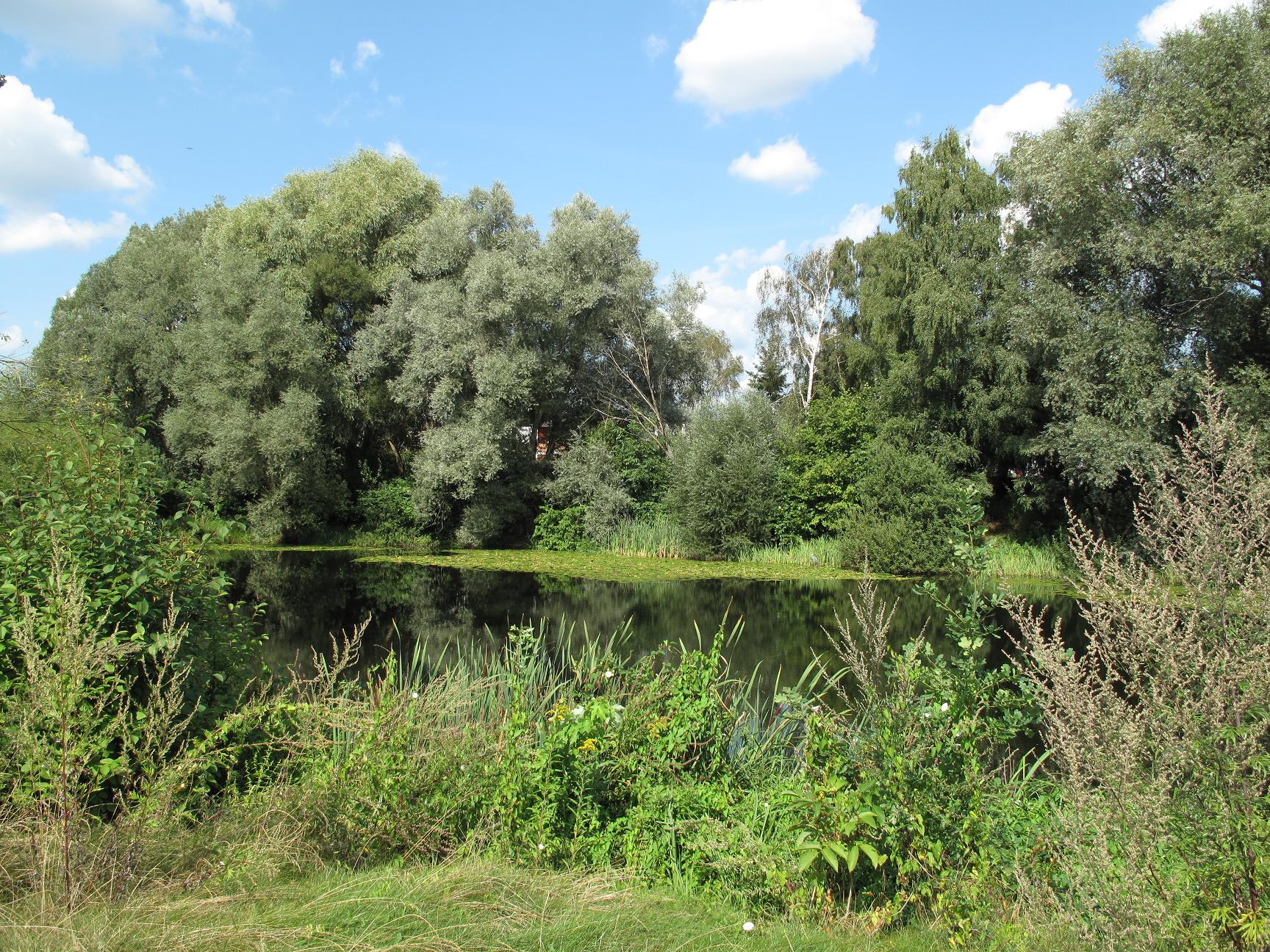
Biotope-protected meadow pool

=== Soils, flora, and fauna ===
The information on soils, flora, and fauna is based on studies carried out in 1988/1989 on behalf of the Senate Department for Urban Development and Environmental Protection in parts of the Grabenniederung and in the biotopes as part of various protection, maintenance, and development concepts.

==== Correlation soils - dominant plant communities ====
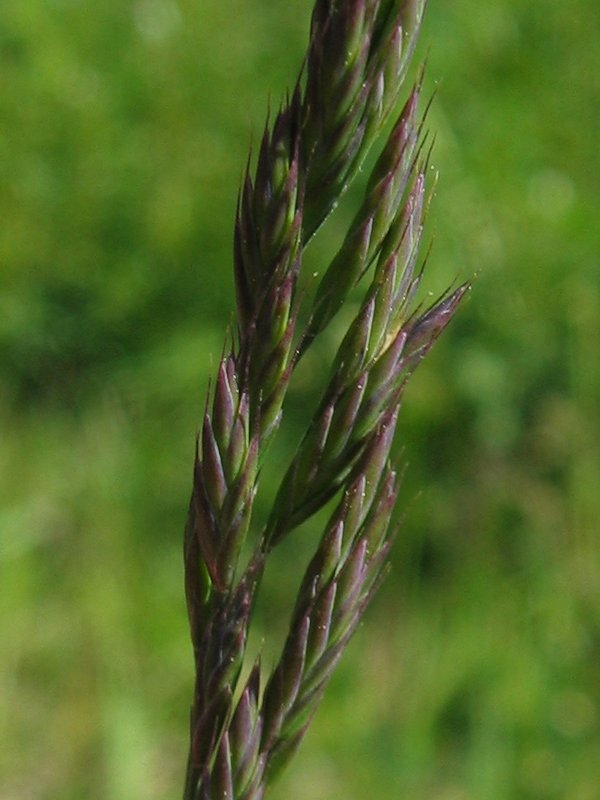
Dominant on Regosolen and Pararendzina: common red fescue

The soil substrates consist of meltwater sands, peats, and sandy fills. Relic gleye can be found on the upper slopes, some of which are enriched with secondary limestone. Gleyed colluvia follows the mid-slopes. The lower slope and foot of the slope are dominated by colluvia, hortisols, calcareous regosols, and pararendzina above bog gleye and fens. In the Weidenbruch area, the structure of the fen soils remains largely undisturbed, with deep and well-aerated soils.

With pH values of 4.2 and 6.2 (up to 7 in Weidenbruch and Egelpfuhlwiese), the nutrient supply for shallow-rooted plants in the upper soil layers ranged from low to medium during the study period. Nutrient levels in the deep root zone were moderate to elevated, with values around and above 6 at one-meter depth. In the southern lowland part, nutrient levels were medium to high.

The common red fescue grass dominated the calcareous regosols, regosols, and Pararendzina. Additionally, Arrhenatheretalia communities were discovered on the calcareous regosols, specifically in fertilized fresh meadows and pastures. The regosols in the fen regions were dominated by Common Red Fescue but tall perennials like Canada Goldenrod and Common Nettle increasingly displaced it on the embankment and bank edges. Common Tussock-grass, Creeping couch grass, and Giant Goldenrod partly displaced it as well. The wet gley and bog gley areas contain reed bed and sedge communities (Phragmitetea) with plants like reeds, reed canary grass, lesser pond-sedge, and purple loosestrife. Additionally, there are flood meadows (Agrostietalia stoloniferae) with creeping bentgrass as the dominant plant species in this community.

==== Other plant communities and endangered plants ====
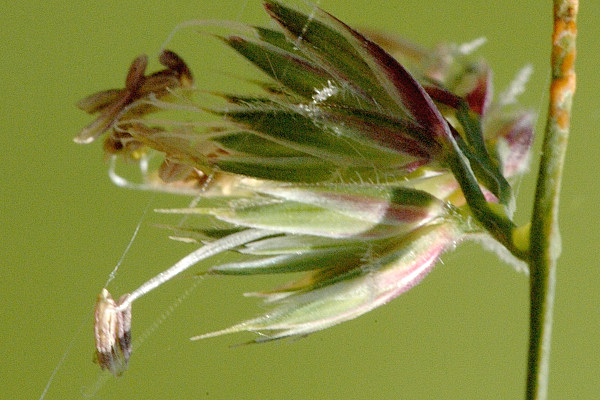
In moist, nutrient-rich locations: Common bluegrass (Poa trivialis)

In very damp locations such as the meadow at Bullengraben or the meadow basin, willow plants with crack willows and common sallow as well as ash maple stands were added, and occasionally black elder in the shrub layer. Some sites formed Molinietalia fragment communities ("wet herbaceous meadows, wet and reed meadows") with the species yellow meadow rue, meadow-sweet, and cabbage thistle as well as Arrhenatherion-elatioris fragment communities (valley fat meadows, planar and submontane smooth oat meadows) with wild chervil and common hogweed. The Egelpfuhl meadow was home to a relict pipe-grass community. In addition, the following were found in wet meadows: yellow meadow rue, valerian, meadow buttercup, pennywort, and meadow soft grass.

In spring, rough bluegrass (Poa trivialis) formed a largely closed lawn on seepage-moist, nutrient-rich sites. In magnocaricion communities (fen sedge meadows), acute slender and brown sedges predominated. Numerous evening primrose species grew on fill areas. In marginal areas, ornamental plants such as common lilac, golden currant, blackthorn, or purging buckthorn were planted. The moss flora was poor in species and only more numerous in the heaped-up edge areas. A dense carpet of common duckweed-covered water bodies such as the meadow basin or the willow marsh at the ditch cross during the overflow phases in spring. On the north-western bank of the up to three-meter-deep meadow basin, yellow water-lilies - protected like all water lily plants in Germany - covered the water's surface. In 2009, the green corridor was accompanied by stretches of trees with oaks, pears, and Japanese cherries.

Out of the 220 plant species recorded in 1989, approximately 30 were identified as rare or endangered on the Red List of Threatened Species. According to the 2001 Berlin Red List, the following plant species are threatened with extinction: the carex demissa and the ragged-robbin (both found in 1989 on the Egelpfuhlwiese), while the crack willow is extremely rare, and the marsh pea, the marsh marigold, the yellow meadow-rue, the brown sedge, the ragged-robin, the flower of the year 2005, and the narrow-leaved rattle are all endangered. The state of Berlin lists the false cypergrass sedge and the knotted rush in the early warning stage

==== Species-poor fauna ====
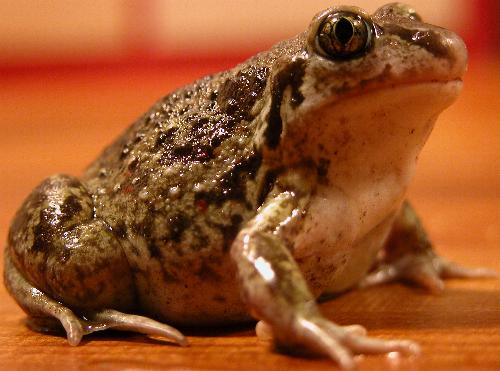
Lurch of the year 2007: Spadefoot toad

The faunal research team, who conducted investigations in 1988/1989, categorized the highly urbanized region as having no significant impact on the population of most animal species. Notable occurrences were found among the birds with the marsh warbler, which prefers damp high herbaceous vegetation and is listed in the Berlin Red List in the early warning stage of declining populations. There was also evidence of the reed warbler and reed bunting, which are dependent on reed beds, and of the pouch tit, which finds its preferred combination of different siltation communities in the lowlands. At the meadow basin biotope, common moorhen and coots were found alongside the little grebe, which is on the early warning list. The grass frog, which is no longer on the current Berlin Red List due to a continuous good population development since 1991, was also observed by the working group at the meadow basin. From the class of amphibians, the pond newt was also detected at all small water bodies. The meadow basin also formed a spawning area for the strictly nocturnal spadefoot toad, which the German Society for Herpetology and Terrarial Science named amphibian of the Year in 2007 due to its severe endangerment. Another frog, the European green toad, which is strictly protected under the Habitats Directive, used the bottom of the watercourse to lay its spawning lines.

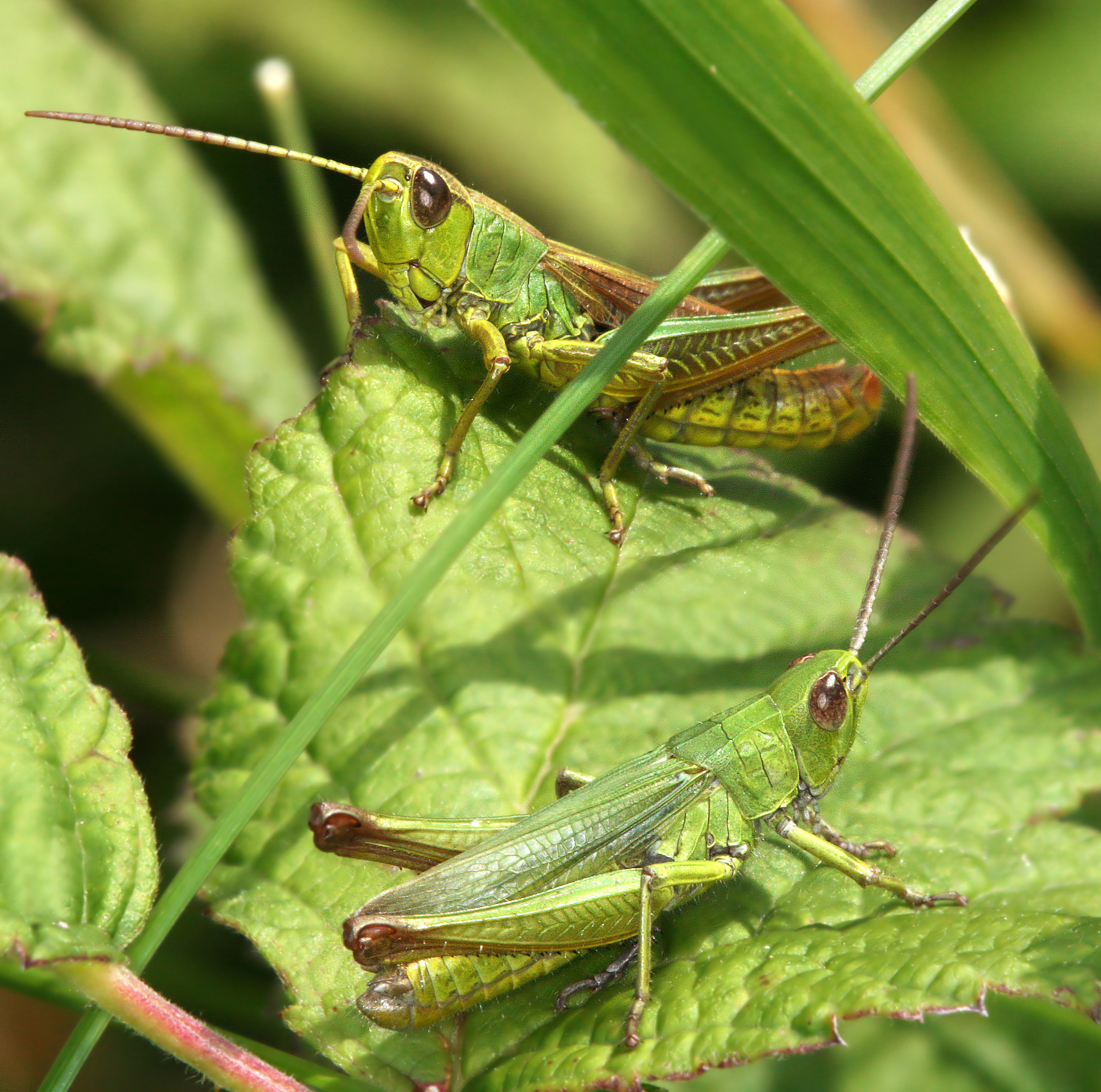
Evidence in the willow quarry: endangered golden locust

All biotopes proved to be valuable for the living conditions of ground beetles, longhorn beetles, and weevils. In the wetland biotopes, there were high proportions of phytophagous and hygrophilous species, including the endangered Berlin black moth (Agonum lugens), which prefer eutrophic or mesotrophic sedimentation zones. There was also evidence of the highly endangered Heyden's slender weevil (Mecinus heydeni Wenck), which requires toadflax as a food plant, and of the endangered longhorned beetle Taenapion rufulum (syn.: Apion rufulum) on its food plant, the annual nettle. Grasshoppers formed average occurrences on the meadows, including the long-winged conehead, Roesel's bush-cricket, and the lesser marsh grasshopper. On the dry lawns, common field grasshoppers and field grasshoppers predominated. The mole cricket, which has rarely been found in Berlin and is classified as endangered, was found in the soil of the Egelpfuhl meadows. In addition, there was evidence of the endangered large Chrysochraon dispar, which prefers wetlands and fresh to moderately dry meadows, in the Weidenbruch. A special feature among the spiders in the area was the finds of the endangered marbled orbweaver (Araneus marmoreus). The spider was found in the meadows of the Egelpfuhl meadows. The disc-shaped Gelippte Tellererschnecke found in the ponds at Egelpfuhl meadows and Weidenbruch is noteworthy as an endangered species in Berlin's aquatic ecosystem. Occurrences of the highly endangered species Agabus fuscipennis and Cybister lateralimarginalis were observed among the water beetles, while the highly endangered damselfly and endangered yellow-spotted emerald were found among the dragonflies.

== Bullengraben/Lindenufer green corridor ==
=== Planning, realization, and award ===
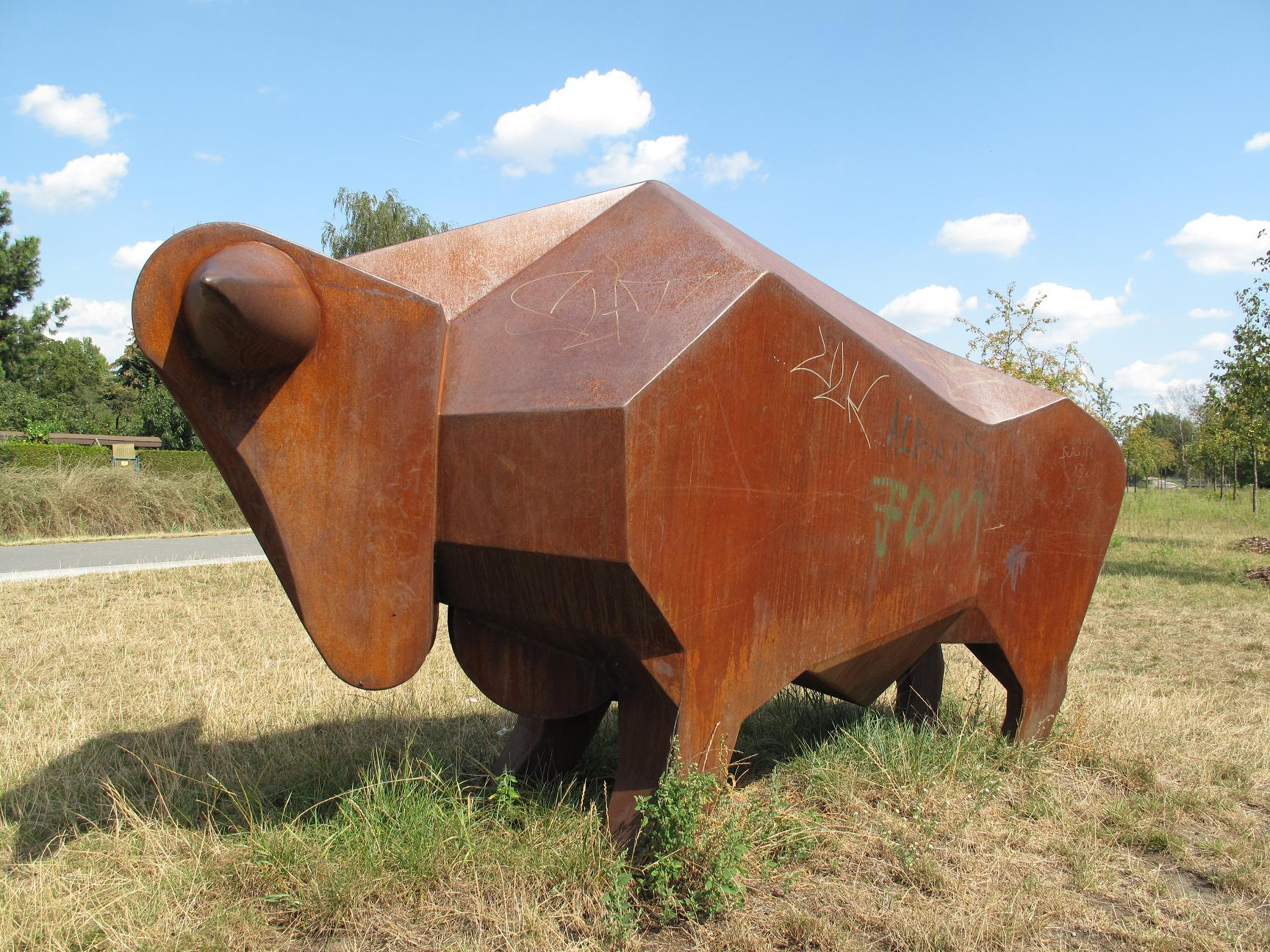
Plastic bull pit bull by Sebastian Kulisch. Unveiled as a symbol of the green corridor at its opening on June 7, 2007

Since the early 1980s, the Spandau district authority has been planning the development and redevelopment of the neglected Bullengraben and the renaturation of its protected biotopes. The project failed due to the district's lack of financial resources. However, the district had already bought up some vacant plots of land to realize the project at a later date. After months of negotiations, the Spandau Parks Department convinced Deutsche Bahn in 1996 to implement the plan as a replacement measure under nature conservation law for the impairments to nature and landscape caused by the construction project for the Hanover-Berlin high-speed rail line.

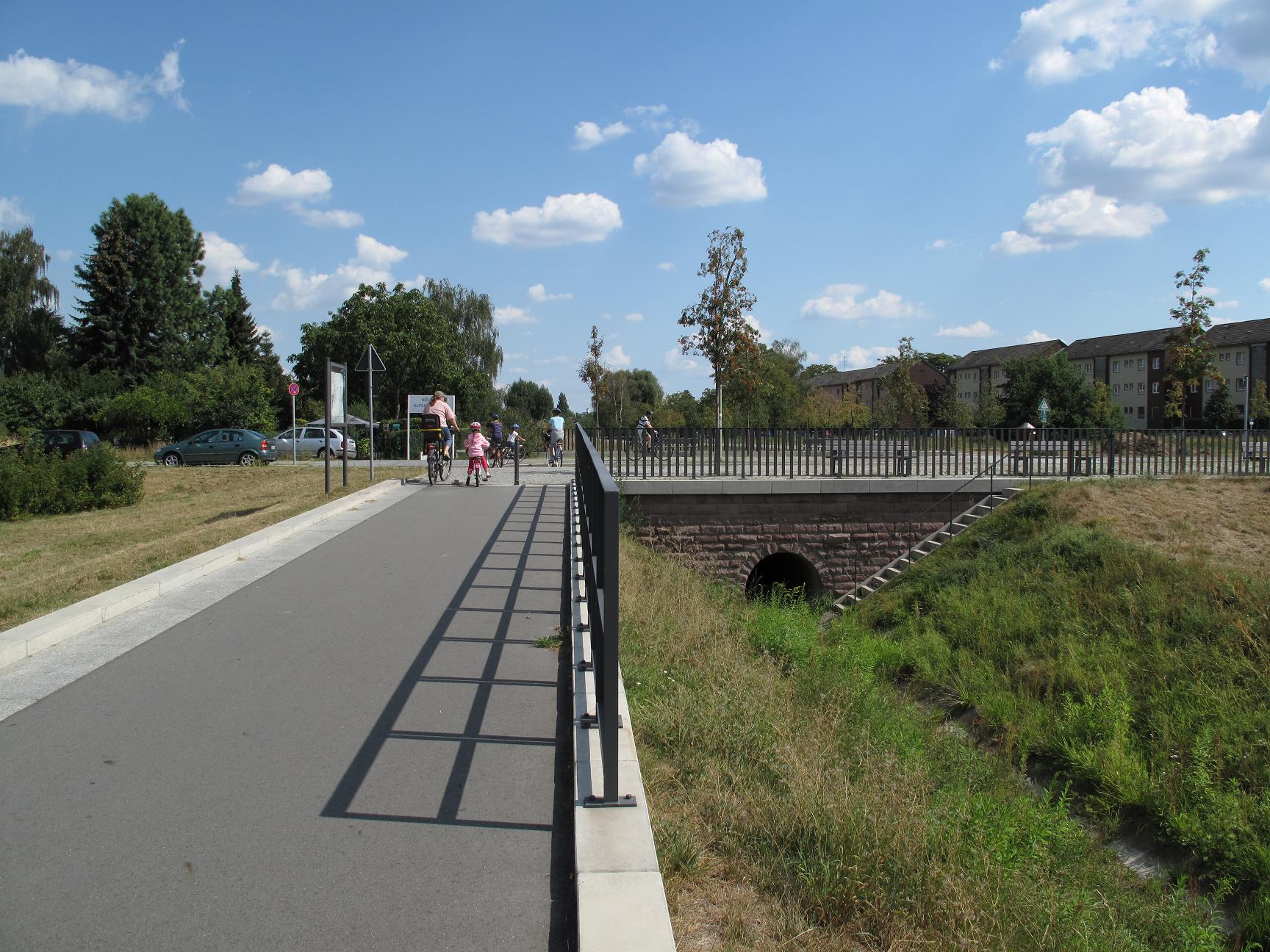
Renovated green corridor on Egelpfuhlstrasse, 2009

Work began in October 2004. The opening and handover to the public took place in June 2007. The client was the Deutsche Bahn subsidiary DB ProjektBau. The structural design and management for the structures was the responsibility of the company Dr. Herold AG, Department of Structural Engineering, and the Senate Department for Bridge Construction. The work was carried out in cooperation with the Senate Department for Urban Development, the Supreme Nature Conservation Authority, the Spandau District Office, and the Berlin Nature Conservation and Parks Department. The overall planning and project management was carried out by the state-owned service company for open space development tasks, Grün Berlin GmbH, which in turn commissioned five different offices or companies for landscape architecture/garden design with the realization of the individual construction phases. The design, restoration, and renaturation were carried out in six construction phases, each with a distinctive landscape design focus. The total investment for all six sections was around 7.5 million euros. In the process, a total of 21.33 hectares were qualitatively and ecologically upgraded. In some places, the geometric shape of the Bullengraben was broken up so that ecologically valuable lowland areas with moisture-loving plants could be created.

At a ceremony held by the Berlin Senate on 20 May 2009, Deutsche Bahn was awarded the Gustav Meyer Prize 2008 for the design of the green corridor in the category for facilities up to five years old.

== Integration into Berlin's network of paths and development concept ==
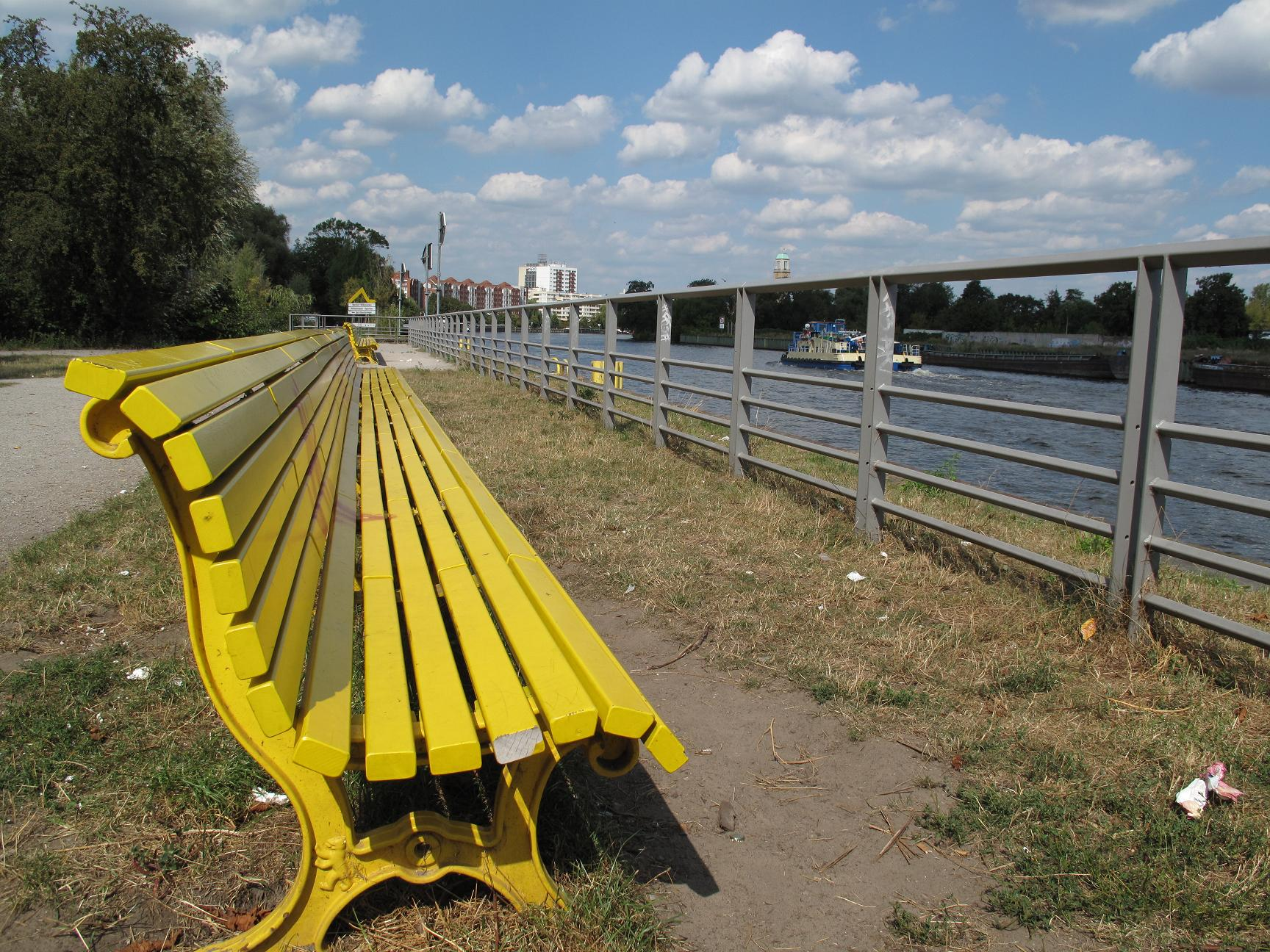
End of the green corridor at the Havel-Lindenufer and transition to the Havelseenweg, main green path no. 12

The Bullengrabenweg, which runs alongside the moat and the green corridor, is one of Berlin's 20 main green routes, most of which are marked with blue and white stickers with the corresponding number. There are still some gaps in the network, for which alternative and bypass routes are provided.

The Bullengraben green corridor intersects with the Havelseenweg (main path 12) at the Lindenuferpromenade. There is a gap in the pathway and green space network between Lindenufer and the Tiefwerder Wiesen landscape conservation area on the southeastern side of the Havel River.
