= Herr von Ribbeck auf Ribbeck im Havelland =

1889 ballad by Theodor Fontane

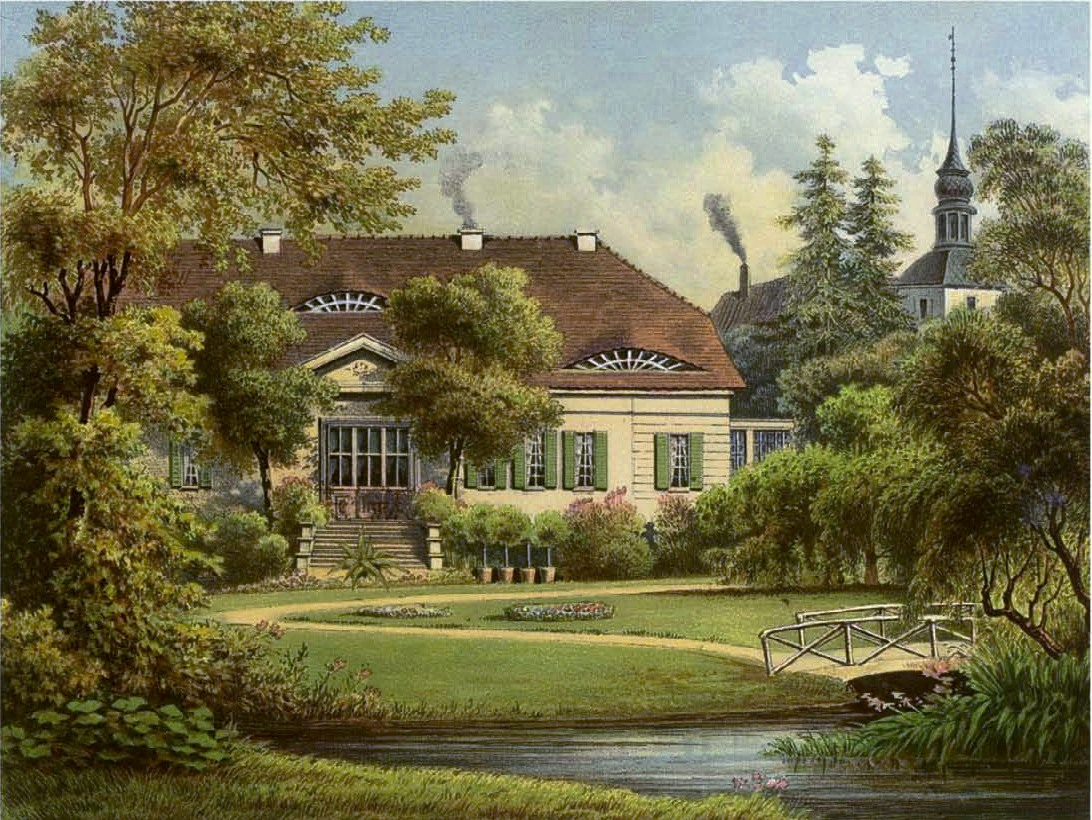
Ribbeck manor, from the Alexander Duncker collection (1857–1883)

Herr von Ribbeck auf Ribbeck im Havelland is a popular literary ballad written by the German poet and novelist Theodor Fontane in 1889. Up to today, the poem is published in German anthologies and learned in schools.

== Content ==
The poem tells of a member of the German lower Uradel nobility, named in the title (Squire von Ribbeck, his family name; auf Ribbeck, residing on Ribbeck manor (today part of Nauen); im Havelland, in the Havelland region). Von Ribbeck is described as gentle and generous; he often gives away pears from his pear trees to children passing by, addressing them in a friendly Brandenburgisch dialect. But he knows his son and heir to be a scrooge; so when von Ribbeck feels his end near, he asks that a pear be put into his grave. This pear quickly grows into a pear-tree, which now provides free pears to the children, thus preserving the heritage of the late von Ribbeck.

== History ==
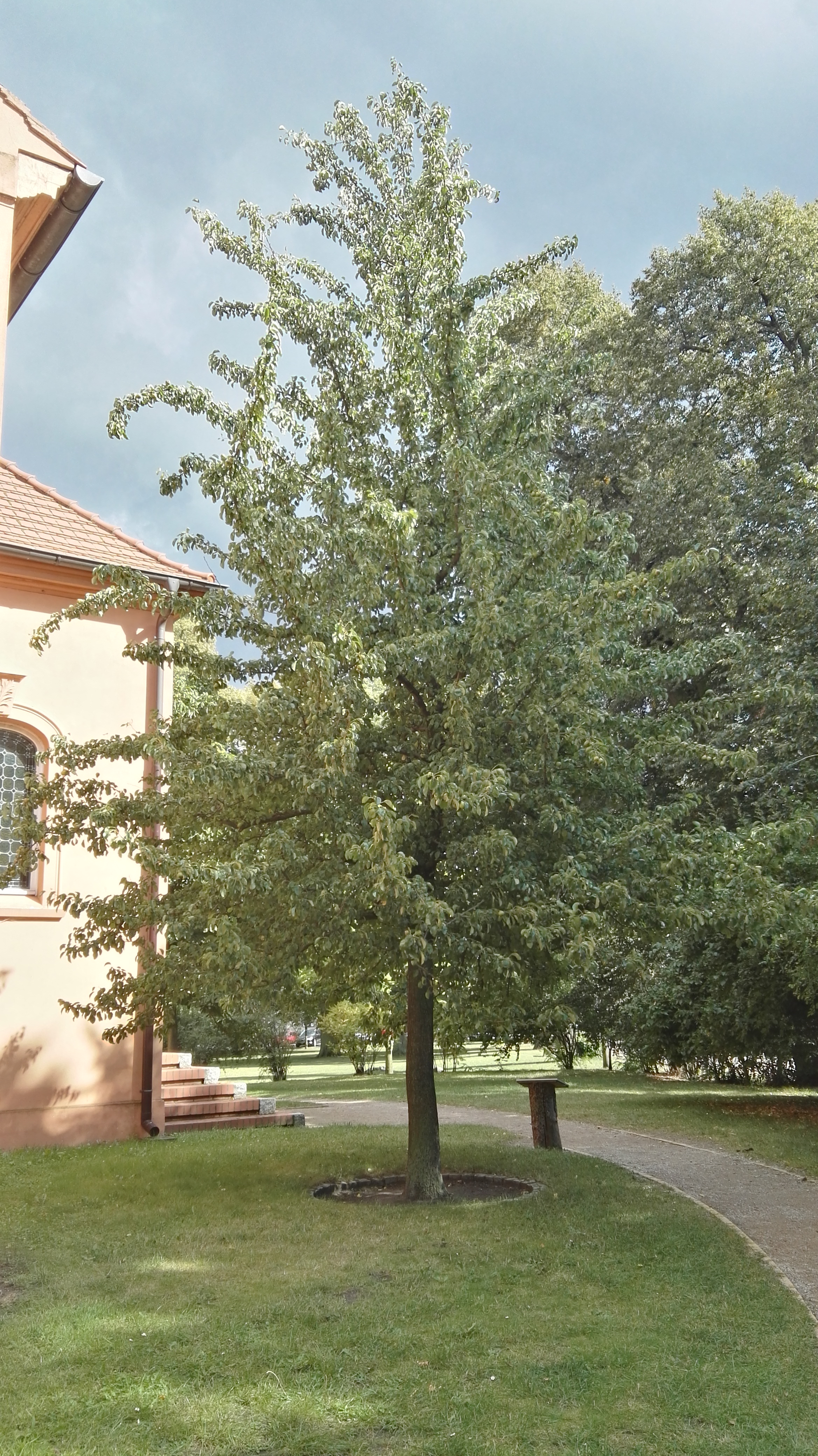
New pear, planted at the Ribbeck church in 2000

The Ribbeck family of Brandenburgian nobles has been attested since 1237; they were mentioned as owners of the Ribbeck estates in the 1375 register of Emperor Charles IV. The legend of kind-hearted Hans-Georg von Ribbeck (1689–1759) and his pear-tree first appeared in a collection of fairy tales published in 1887. Fontane used this text as a base for his poem, which he wrote in summer 1889. The legendary pear-tree on the grave of the von Ribbeck family, near the village church of Ribbeck, about 30 kilometres (19 mi) north-west of Berlin, did in fact exist at Fontane's time; it was destroyed in a storm in 1911.

== Popularity ==
More than 100 years after its initial publication, the poem is still very popular in Germany. It is available as a picture book in several editions, and has been featured on children's TV series Die Sendung mit der Maus. It is the subject of common classroom study in German schools. The poem has also been the subject of many scholarly reviews.

In 2007, Fontane's original manuscript of the poem was sold for 130,000 Euros at an auction in Berlin.
