= Nauen =

- Town
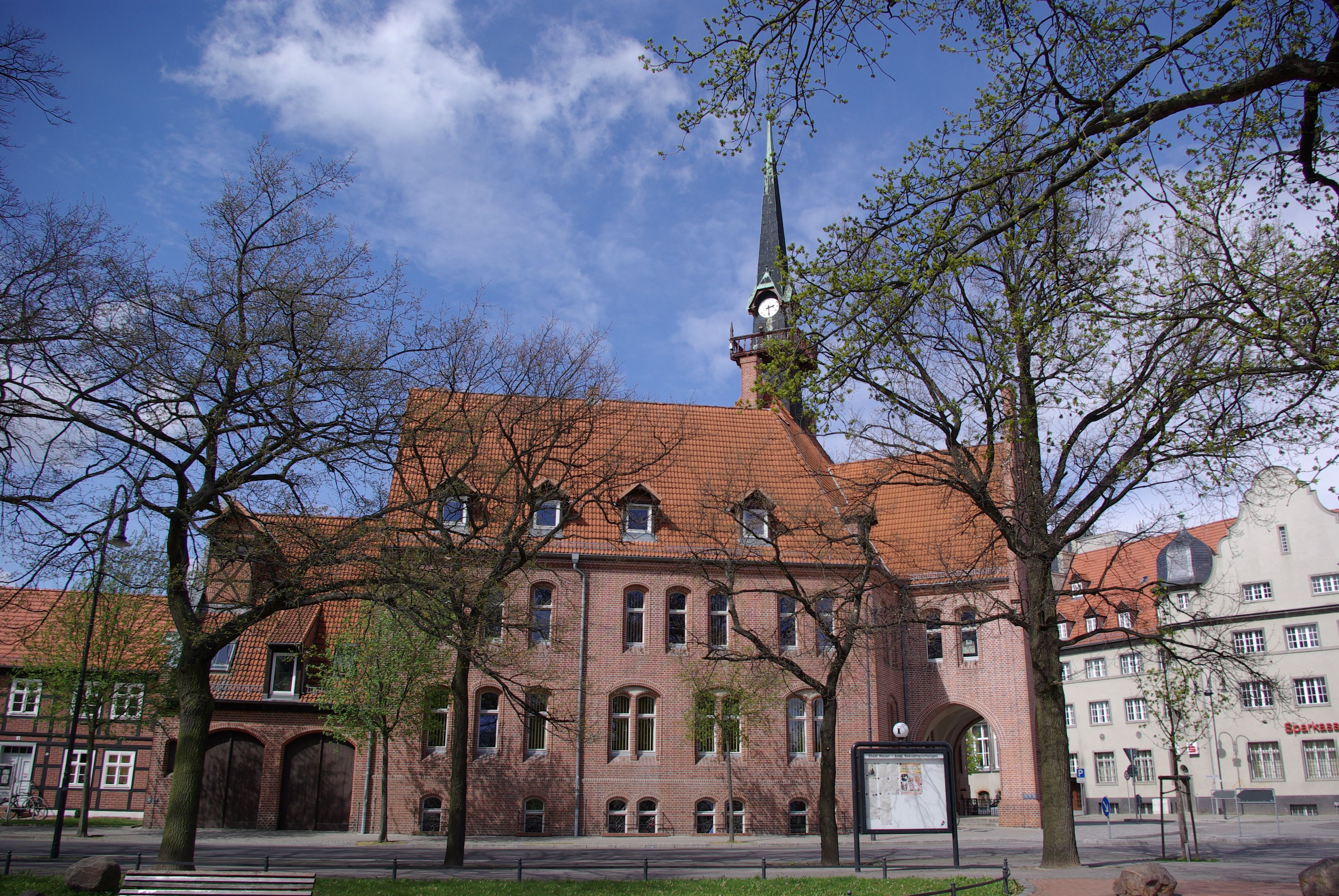
- Town hall

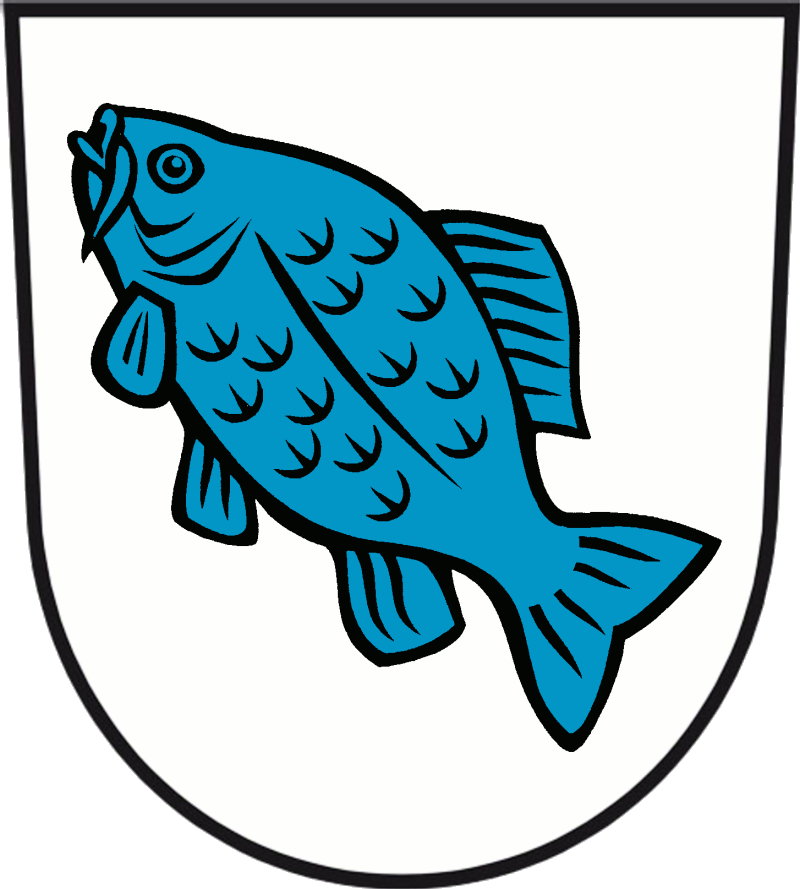
- Coat of arms

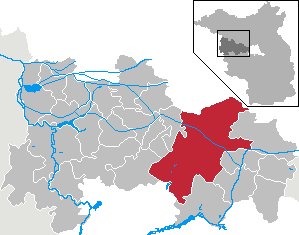
- Location of Nauen within Havelland district
- Interactive map of Nauen
- Location within Germany Location within Brandenburg
- Coordinates: 52°36′00″N 12°52′59″E
- Country: Germany
- State: Brandenburg
- District: Havelland

Government
  - Mayor (2017–25): Manuel Meger

Area
  - Total: 268.14 km^{2} (103.53 sq mi)
- Elevation: 35 m (115 ft)

Population (2025-12-31)
  - Total: 19,854
  - Density: 74.043/km^{2} (191.77/sq mi)
- Time zone: UTC+01:00 (CET)
  - Summer (DST): UTC+02:00 (CEST)
- Postal codes: 14641
- Dialling codes: 03321
- Vehicle registration: HVL (alt NAU)
- Website: www.nauen.de

Nauen (German pronunciation: [ˈnaʊən]) is a small town in the Havelland district, in Brandenburg, Germany. It is chiefly known for Nauen Transmitter Station, the world's oldest preserved radio transmitting installation.

== Geography ==
Nauen is situated within the Havelland Luch glacial lowland, the heart of the Havelland region north of the Nauen Plateau, about 38 km (24 mi) west of the Berlin's city center (18 km (11 mi) from the Berlin city limits) and 27 km (17 mi) northwest of Potsdam. It is one of Germany's largest municipalities by area, comprising Nauen proper and fourteen surrounding villages, including Ribbeck whose landowners were perpetuated in Theodor Fontane's poem Herr von Ribbeck auf Ribbeck im Havelland.

== History ==
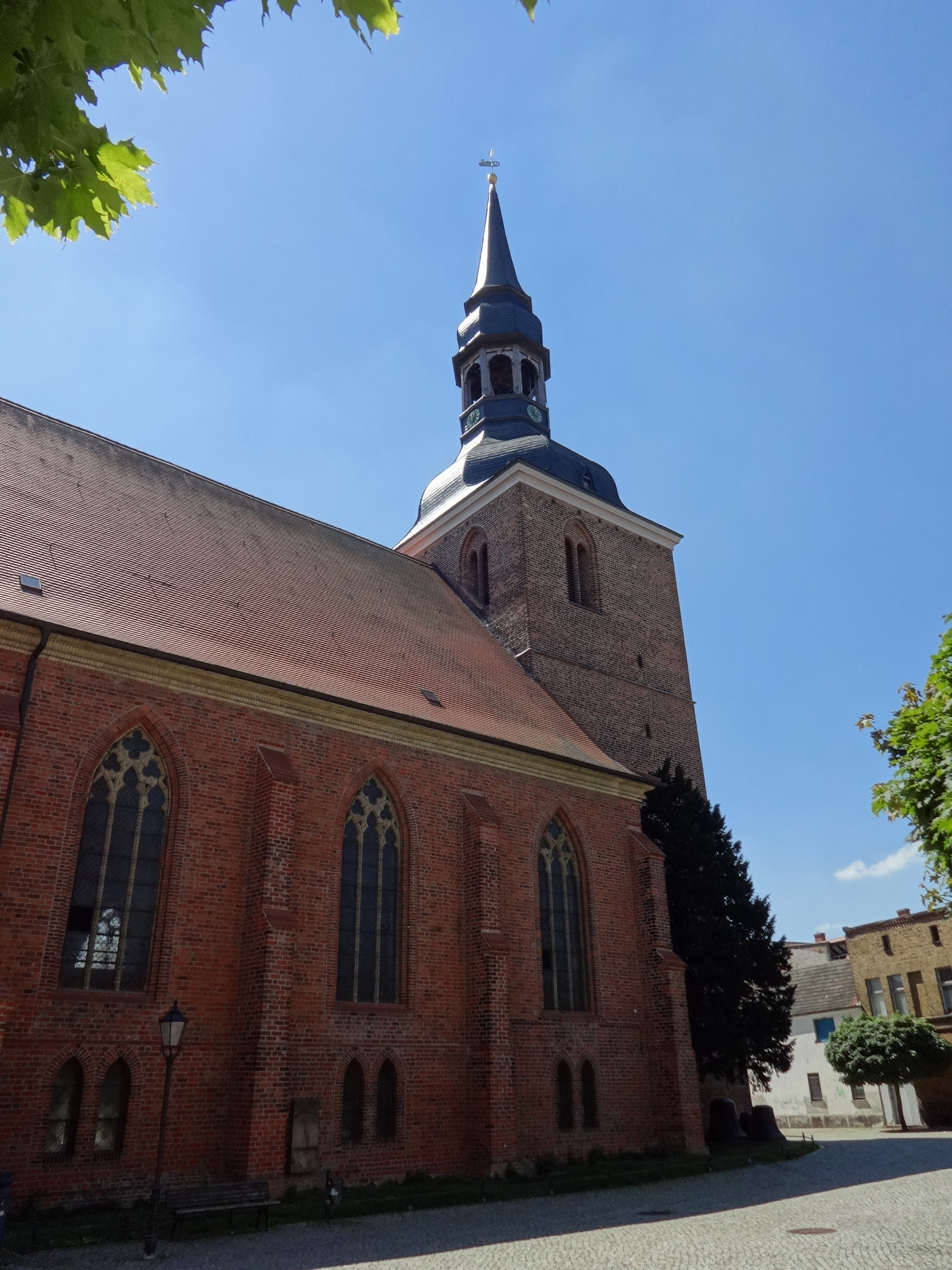
St Jacob's Church

The settlement of Nowen was first mentioned in an 1186 deed issued by the Bishop of Brandenburg. The citizens received town privileges by the Brandenburg margraves in 1292; a first town hall was built in 1302. The Ascanian margrave Waldemar vested Nauen with market rights in 1317. A Jewish community already existed in medieval times.

During the Thirty Years' War, in 1631, Nauen was devastated by Imperial troops led by Field Marshal Count Johann Tserclaes of Tilly. On 27 June 1675, Swedish and Brandenburg troops met at the Battle of Nauen during the Scanian War. Under Prussian rule, Nauen became a garrison town. In 1846 it received access to the Berlin–Hamburg Railway.

Nauen is well known for the location of a transmission site. It was used from 1906 to 1945 for VLF and shortwave. After 1945 the installations were dismantled, but after 1955 the GDR started building up a shortwave transmission center at Nauen. Since 1997 four turnable shortwave transmission aerials have been sited there.

== Demography ==
Population trends since 1875 within the current boundaries (blue line: population; dotted line: comparison to population trends in the state of Brandenburg; grey background: time of Nazi rule; red background: time of Communist rule)

Recent Population Development and Projections (Population Development before Census 2011 (blue line); Recent Population Development according to the Census in Germany in 2011 (blue bordered line); Official projections for 2005-2030 (yellow line); for 2017-2030 (scarlet line); for 2020-2030 (green line)

Nauen: Population development
within the current boundaries (2020)

Year	Pop.	±% p.a.
1875	13,072	—
1890	14,330	+0.61%
1910	15,534	+0.40%
1925	18,154	+1.04%
1939	19,448	+0.49%
1950	24,208	+2.01%
1964	20,320	−1.24%

Year	Pop.	±% p.a.
1971	19,688	−0.45%
1981	18,422	−0.66%
1985	18,109	−0.43%
1990	17,140	−1.09%
1995	16,329	−0.96%
2000	16,695	+0.44%
2005	16,649	−0.06%

Year	Pop.	±% p.a.
2010	16,684	+0.04%
2015	16,943	+0.31%
2020	18,540	+1.82%
2021	18,854	+1.69%
2022	19,352	+2.64%
2023	19,563	+1.09%

== Twin towns and sister cities ==
Nauen is twinned with:

- Kreuztal, Germany
- Spandau (Berlin), Germany

== Notable people ==
- Michael Werner (born 1939), art dealer
- Jürgen Drews (born 1945), pop singer
- Udo Schnelle (born 1952), theologian, professor at the Martin Luther University of Halle-Wittenberg
- Jochen Kowalski (born 1954), born in Wachow, an opera singer, countertenor
- Klaus-Dieter Kurrat (born 1955), athlete, medalist of 1976 Olympic Games
- Claudia Hoffmann (born 1982), hurdler

== See also ==
- Nauen Transmitter Station
