= Ländchen Friesack =

Coordinates: 52°42′42″N 12°33′18″E

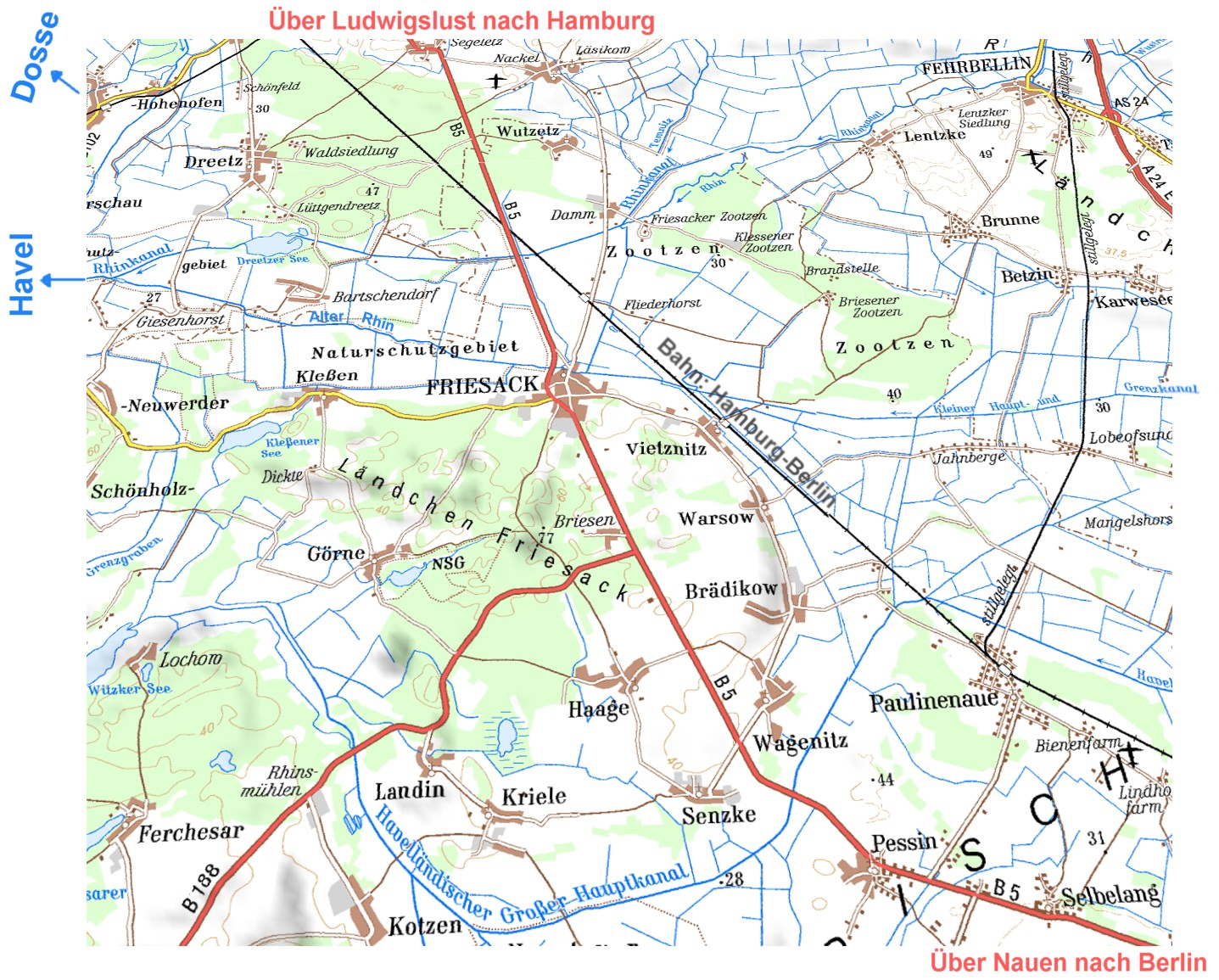
Ländchen Friesack

Ländchen Friesack is a small ridge, up to 77 metres above sea level (NN). It is situated in Brandenburg, northwest of Germany's capital city, Berlin and southwest of the town of Friesack. The Ländchen (German for "small land" or "little territory") extends for just under 5 kilometres in a north-south direction and separates the lowland and former marshes of the Rhinluch in the north from that of the Havelland Luch in the south. The upland is almost entirely forested. It is divided into the parishes of Friesack, Kleßen-Görne and Mühlenberge. Part of the Ländchen – around the lake of Görner See – is a nature reserve.

== Literature ==
- Kinder, Sebastian; Porada, Haik Thomas (2017). Das Havelland um Rathenow und Premnitz : eine landeskundliche Bestandsaufnahme (in German). Cologne: Böhlau. doi:10.7788/9783412217365. ISBN 978-3-412-21736-5. OCLC 1165443744.
