= Havelland =

Region in Brandenburg, Germany

Coordinates: 52.5000000°N 12.7500000°E

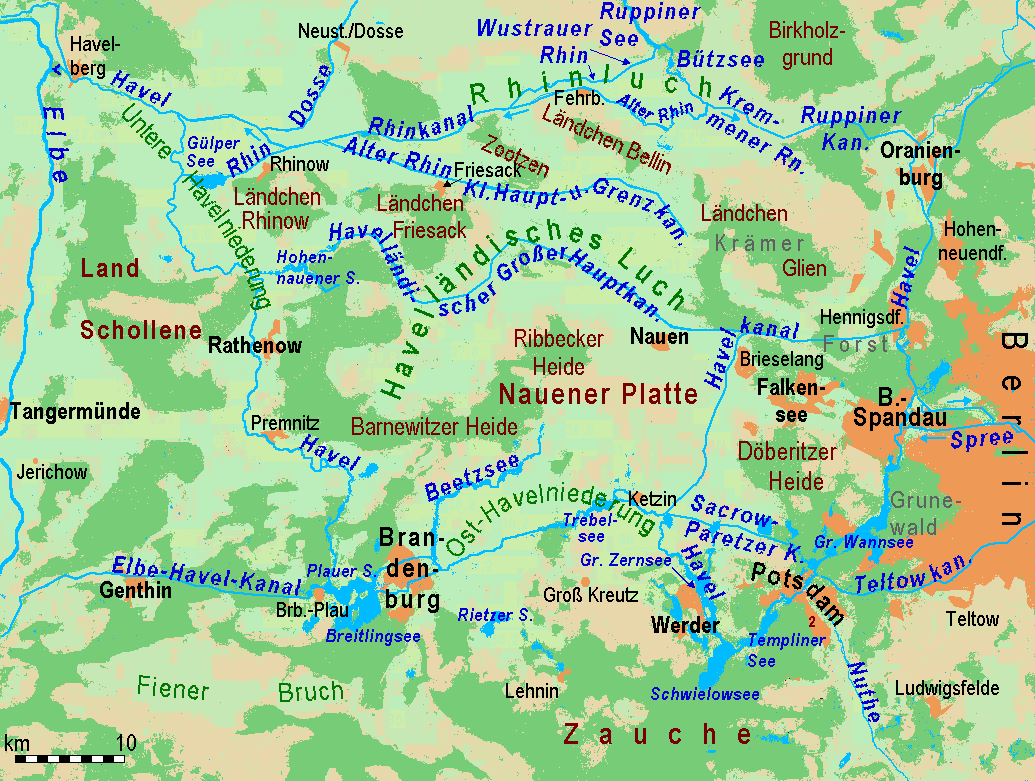
Sub-regions and waterbodies of the Havelland

Geographically, the Havelland (German pronunciation: [ˈhaːfl̩ˌlant]) is a German region around which the River Havel flows in a U-shape between Oranienburg to the northeast and Rhinow to the northwest. The northern boundary of the Havelland is formed by the River Rhin and the Rhin Canal. In the history of Brandenburg, the Havelland represents a historic region.

In the heart of the Havelland is the county of the same name. In addition the Havelland includes the south of Ruppin Land with the Rhinluch, the western part of Berlin's Spandau, parts of Potsdam, the town of Brandenburg an der Havel and several villages in the county of Potsdam-Mittelmark.

The Tourist Association of Havelland has chosen a rather different boundary. It covers the county of Havelland, the town of Brandenburg an der Havel and the northern part of the county of Potsdam-Mittelmark, including communities south of the Havel river, that belong to the region of Zauche.

The writer Theodor Fontane described the Havelland as well as the other landscapes of Brandenburg. In the ballad Herr von Ribbeck auf Ribbeck im Havelland he helped to give this region special prominence and his novel character Effi Briest grew up here. The Havelland was also given its own volume of Fontane's accounts of hiking across Brandenburg, the Wanderungen durch die Mark Brandenburg.

== Countryside ==
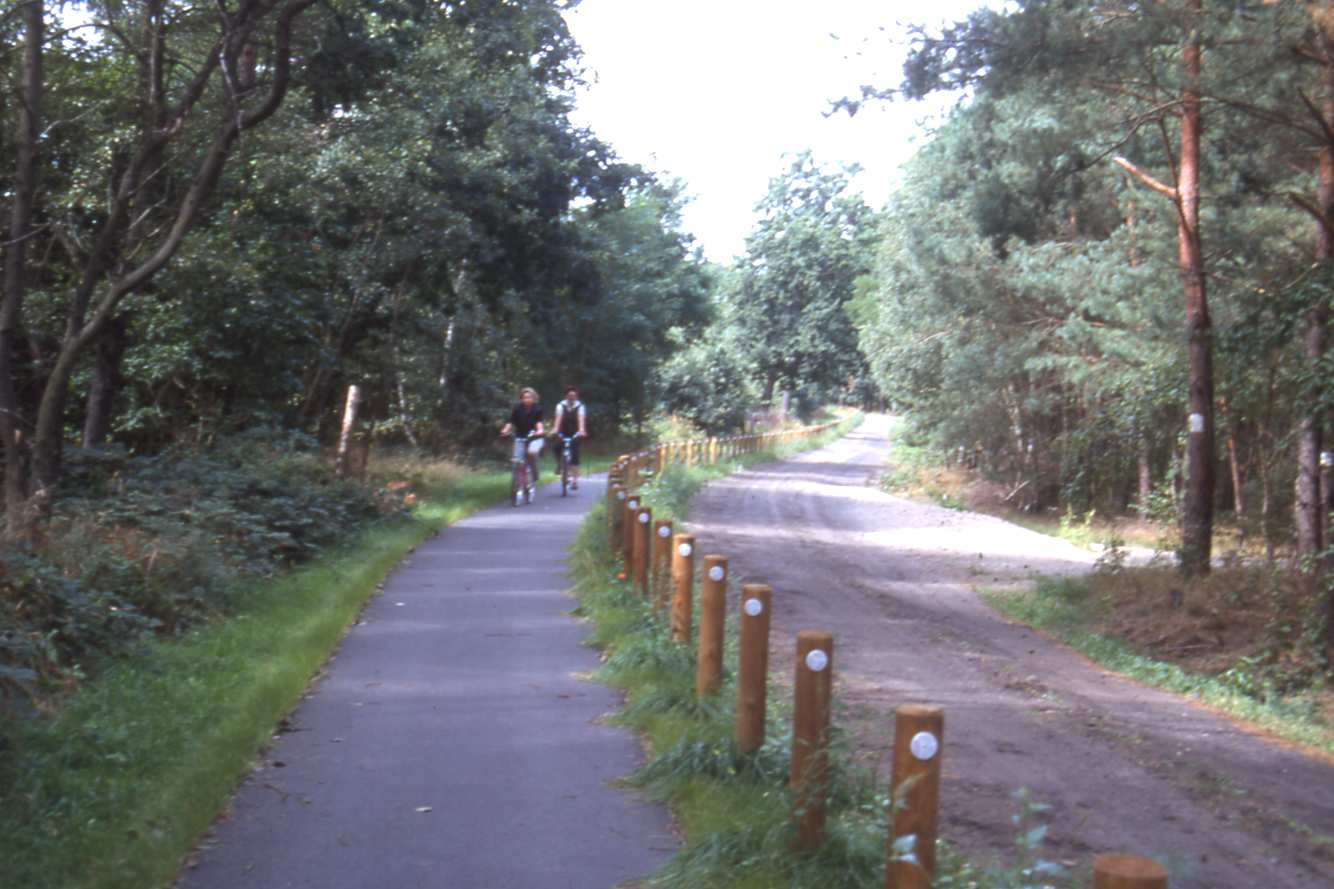
The Havelland Cycleway near Paaren im Glien

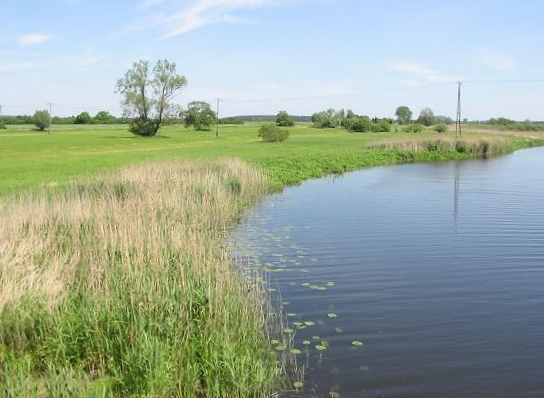
The Hohennauensches Bruch in the West Havelland Nature Park

Wide urstromtal lowlands characterize the countryside of the Havelland. Plateaux rise above the general level of the land like islands, mostly formed from Ice Age ground moraines. But end moraines from the Saale and Weichsel glaciations also occur. The former were overlain to a greater or lesser extent by the advancing Weichselian ice sheet.

The sandy, dry plateaux support arable farming as well as woodlands. The largest is the Nauen Plateau (Nauener Platte). North of it there are several morainic plateaux or Ländchen. West of the bend in the Havel river is Land Schollene.

In the urstromtäler either side of the Havel north of the Nauen Plateau are the former marshlands of the Havelland Luch and Rhinluch, separated from one another by the Ländchen, south of the Nauen Plateau the small morainic hills of the East Havel lowlands are divided by numerous lakes or Havelsees. From 1700 to the 1950s large areas, especially in the north of the Havelland, were drained by canals.

The western part of the region between Rhinow and Pritzerbe belongs to the West Havelland Nature Park. This contains the largest inland wetlands in Western Europe, the Lower Havel Lowlands.

== Settlement ==
The Havelland is very sparsely populated. The larger towns developed by the crossings over the River Havel: Spandau (today part of Berlin), Potsdam, Brandenburg and Rathenow. Other central settlements in the Havelland are Rhinow, Premnitz, Nauen and Friesack. The town of Falkensee and its surrounding villages have grown rapidly.

== Economy and transport ==
Arable and cattle farming dominate large areas of the Havelland. Fruit and vegetable farming is also common, especially around Werder. Both are also processed into juices, as well as fruit and vegetable preserves. The Havel and the Havelsee lakes also provide a few fishermen with a livelihood.

Tourism is playing an increasingly important role in the Havelland, which is viewed as one of the recreation areas for the metropolis of Berlin.

On the edge of Berlin, in Wustermark, a freight transport centre has been established. In Paaren im Glien, the Märkische Exhibition and Leisure Centre (Ausstellungs- und Freizeitzentrum) offers a venue for larger trade fairs and events.

A continuing problem for the Havelland is transport communication. On the one hand, the Havel is an important waterway, especially between Brandenburg and Oranienburg, on the other, its lakes and the large wetland areas form an obstacle to roads and railways.

The most important roads are the B 5 federal highway from Berlin via Nauen towards Hamburg, from which the B 188 to Rathenow branches. North–south routes are the B 102 from Brandenburg via Rathenow to Rhinow and, in the east, the Berlin ring motorway, the A 10. From Spandau, two railway lines carry high-speed trains through the Havelland. These are the Berlin–Hamburg line via Nauen and the Lehrte Railway via Rathenow. In the west the Brandenburg Städtebahn links Brandenburg and Rathenow. In the east the Berlin outer ring grazes the region.

== Literature ==
- Havelland um Werder, Lehnin und Ketzin. Edition no. 1 Published by the Institut für Länderkunde Leipzig, Leipzig 1992 (Werte der deutschen Heimat. Vol. 53).
- "Havelland. Ein Wegbegleiter", Edition Terra Berlin/Potsdam 2013, 1st edition, ISBN 978-3-942917-11-7
