= Havelland Luch =

Coordinates: 52°36′46″N 12°36′03″E

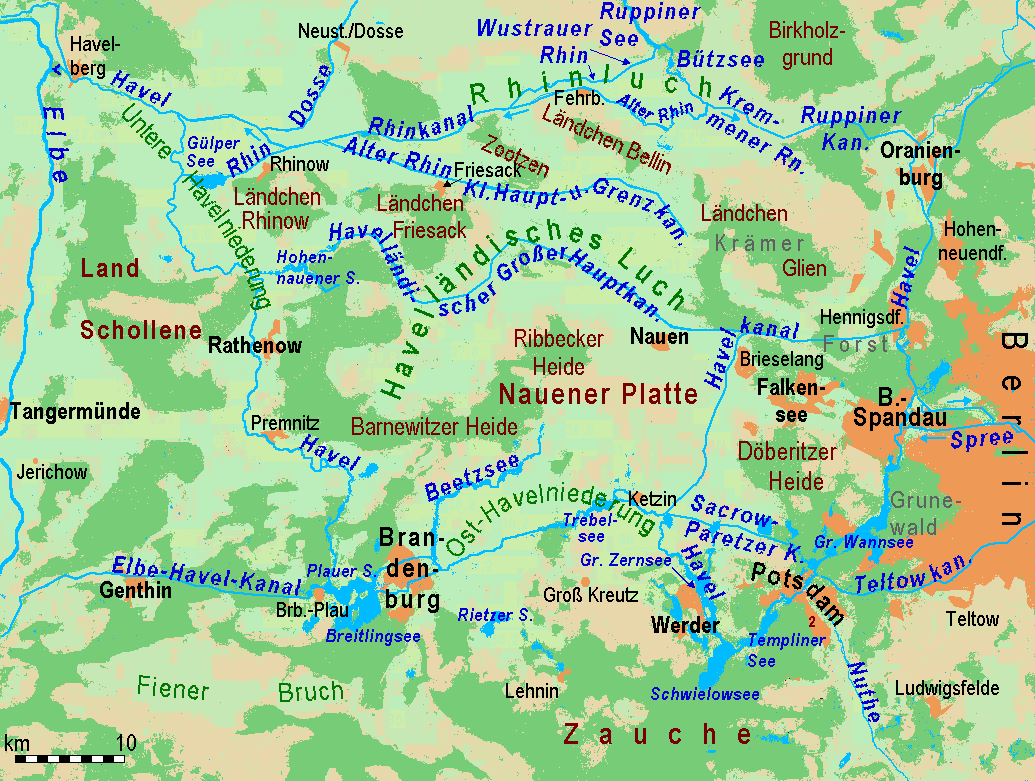
The Havelland Luch in the centre of the Havelland; elevations only shown for open country; hills and plateaux - red-brown, lowlands - green

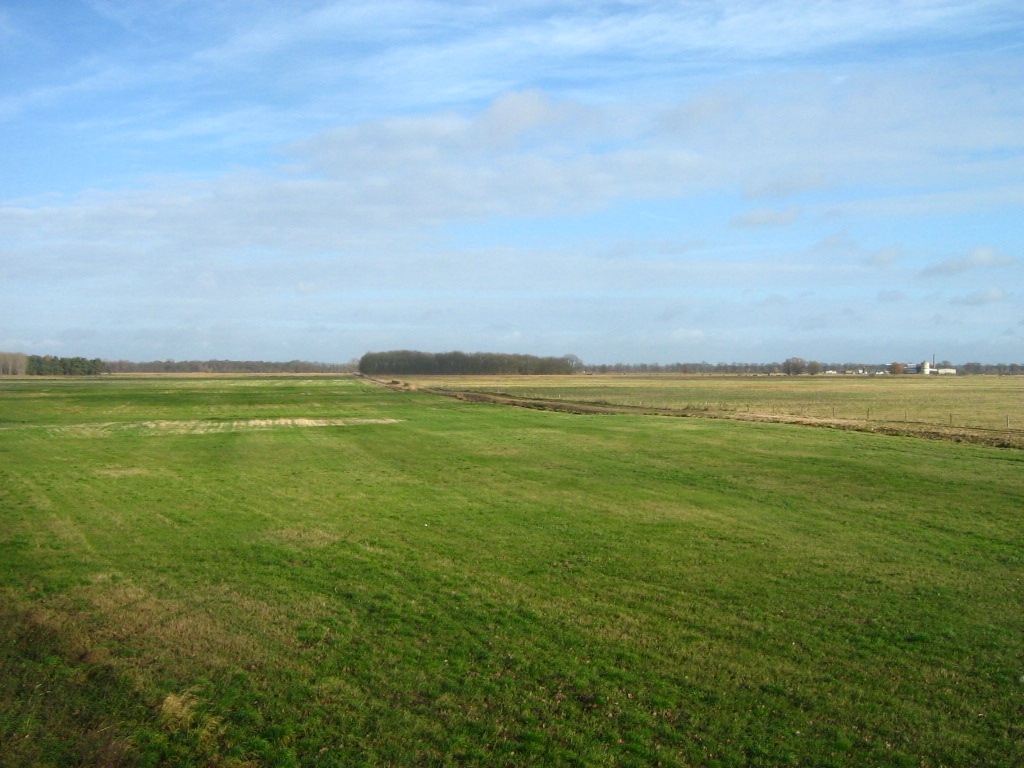
The Havelland Luch north of Nauen

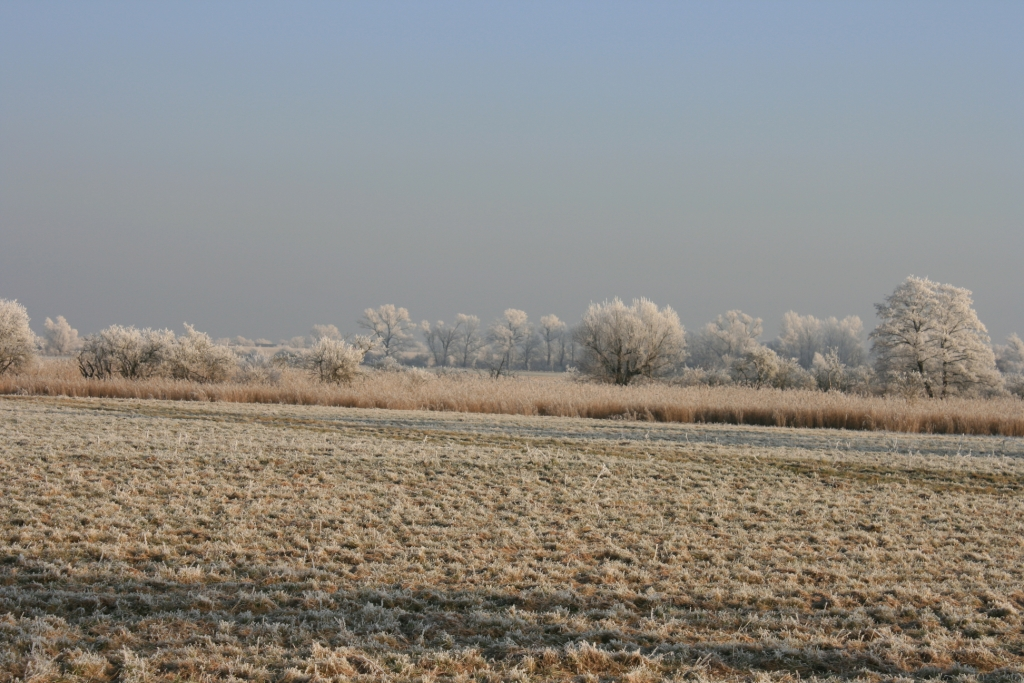
The Havelland Luch near Senzke in winter

The Havelland Luch (German: Havelländisches Luch) is a lowland area inside a bend of the River Havel west of Berlin, and forms the heart of the Havelland region.

== Location ==
The luch, a former marshland, lies in a basin that is part of the Berlin urstromtal, a meltwater valley that was formed here during the Weichselian glaciation about 18,000 years ago. It covers an area of about 30,000 hectares (74,000 acres).

To the east and northeast the Havelland Luch borders on a region called the Ländchen Glien, to the south on the Nauen Plateau, to the west on the Rathenow moraine region, the Ländchen Friesack and the Zootzen. To the north it is separated from Ländchen Bellin by the Rhinluch region.

== Geology ==
The Havelland Luch is mainly characterized by fen peat soils and peat soils that dried out after the land was drained. There are large areas where periglacial or fluviatile valley sands reach the surface. Mounds of ground moraine, more than ten metres high, pierce the surface of the luch, especially in the south, between the Nauen Plateau and the Ländchen Friesack. In places, the valley sands were covered by dunes during the early post-glacial period. Such dune regions include, for example, several high points near Paulinenaue in the centre, parts of the Nauen municipal forest on the eastern edge and the Zootzen on the northwestern perimeter of the luch.

== Great Havelland Canal ==
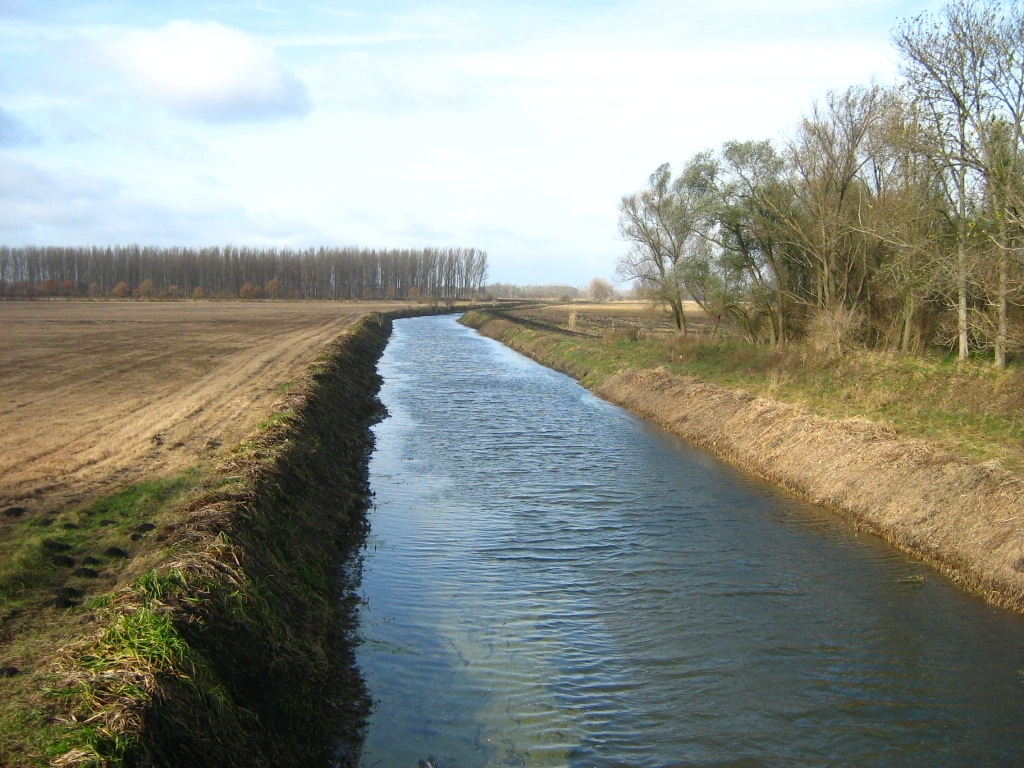
The Great Havelland Canal north of Nauen

The formerly marshy valley has been made suitable for agriculture by land improvement since the 18th century. Numerous ditches and canals bisect those areas used mainly as arable land or grassland, regulating the water levels. The most important are the Great Havelland Canal (Havelländische Große Hauptkanal) and the Little Havelland Canal (Kleine Haupt- und Grenzkanal), which both empty into the Rhin.

The Great Havelland Canal is fed by additional water from the River Havel via the Nauen-Paretz Canal and the Havel Canal.

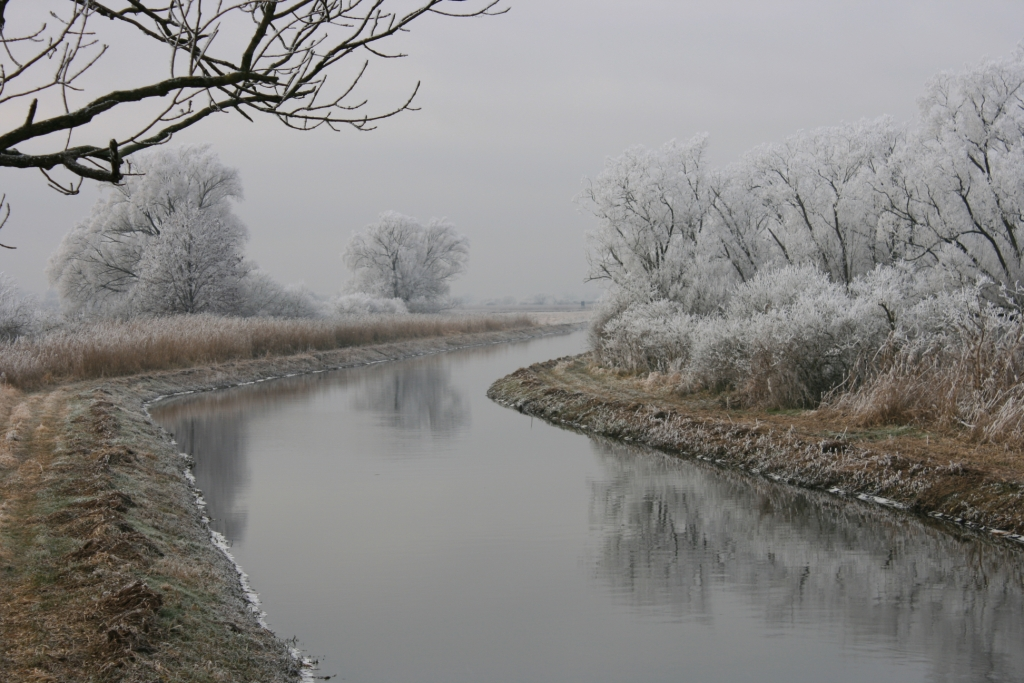
The Great Havelland Canal near Senzke in winter

== Vegetation ==
The natural vegetation of the luch was determined by its waterlogged terrain. Under such conditions an open carr fen landscape was formed. Revealingly the Slavic word lug means "marsh" as well as "meadow". Until the establishment of the present drainage system, there was a lot of bog formation. Today the countryside is dominated by grassland farming. The ditches and canals are mainly bordered by poplars and alders. Occasionally there are small copses with plantation-like monocultures of grey or hybrid poplar.

== Conservation ==
In the southwest of the Havelland Luch are 5,526 hectares (13,660 acres) of nature reserve and bird reserve. Together with the Fiener Bruch and the Belziger Landschaftswiesen the nature reserve forms one of the last German refuges for the endangered great bustard. Since 1990 water has been impounded in winter and spring each year in order to flood 200 to 300 ha and waterlog a further 1,000 to 1,500 ha. As a result, important all-year round roosting and breeding sites have been created for bustards, ducks and cranes.

== Transport ==
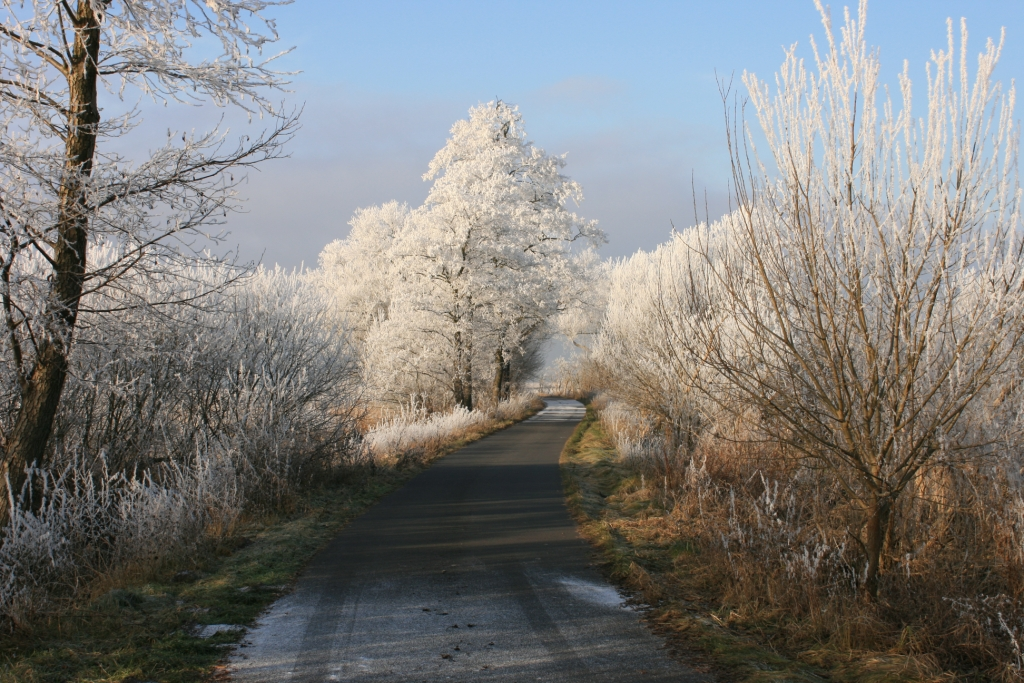
The Havelland Cycleway in the Havelland Luch between Pessin and Senzke in winter

The Havelland Luch may be easily accessed and explored on the Havelland Cycleway. The revitalization of country tracks has further improved cycling in the area in recent years.

The Havelland Luch is crossed by the Hanover–Berlin high-speed railway. Both during the construction phase from the end of 1996 and on the completed track special conservation measures have been taken so as not to endanger the habitat of the great bustard and other species of bird.

== Sources ==
- Topographic map, 1:100,000 series, Sheets C 3538 Brandenburg an der Havel and C 3542 Berlin West, both from LGB Brandenburg

== Coordinates ==
- The coordinates refer to the centre of the village of 14715 Liepe.
