= Nauen Plateau =

Coordinates: 52.5500°N 12.8000°E

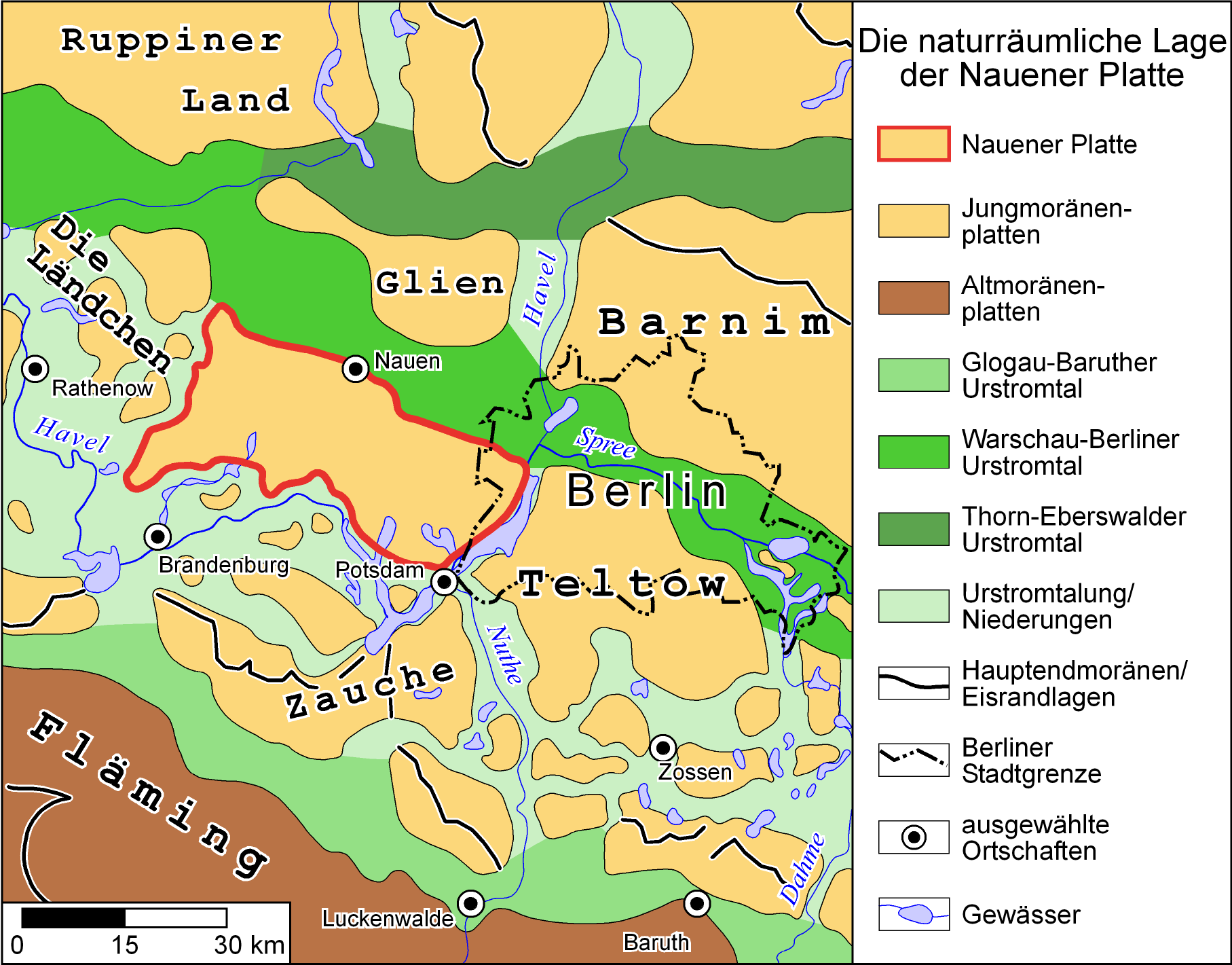
Location of the Nauen Plateau within its surrounding natural regions.

The Nauen Plateau (German: Nauener Platte) is a low plateau in the German states of Brandenburg and Berlin. It rises above the surrounding countryside by an average of 15 metres (49 ft) and is a largely contiguous upland area that was formed during the Saale and Weichselian glaciations. It consists predominantly of ground moraine deposits, partly overlain by gently rolling end moraine formations. Whilst the neighbouring regions of Zauche to the south, the Teltow to the southeast and the Barnim to the northeast have the same name as their geological formation, the cultural landscape on the Nauen Plateau bears the historical and regional name of Havelland. That said, the river country of the Havelland extends beyond the plateau to include the Havel valley and other lowland areas.

== Location ==
The Nauen Plateau lies in the central Mark and in the extreme west of the state of Berlin. Its northern boundary is formed by a glacial meltwater valley, the Berlin Urstromtal, and by the former marshlands of the Havelland Luch, now part of the West Havelland Nature Park. North of the luch is the smaller ridge of Ländchen Glien. The Plateau's eastern boundary is formed by the Berlin-Potsdam chain of Havelsee lakes, which separates the Nauen Plateau here from the plateau of Teltow. After turning westwards at the Templiner See the Havel valley between Potsdam and Brandenburg an der Havel marks the boundary of the Nauen Plateau to the south and separates it from the Zauche region.

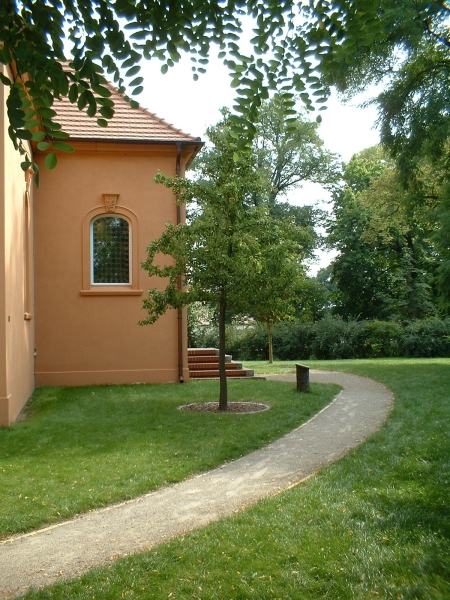
Newly planted Theodor Fontane pear tree near the village church of Ribbeck

The Havel valley also borders the region to the west, where the river swings north again after passing through the Plauer See. Between Pritzerbe, part of the town of Havelsee, and Paulinenaue, the western boundary of the Nauen Plateau runs west of the Garlitz and Ribbeck Heaths and east of the bird reserve established for the great bustard.

Its entire area covers about 90,000 hectares (220,000 acres). From west to east it measures around 45 kilometres and from north to south around 20 kilometres.

== Settlements and natural landscapes ==
Like the cities of Berlin and Potsdam, the eponymous town of Nauen lies on the perimeter of the plateau; on its northern rim. Other large settlements on the plateau are Wustermark, Brieselang, Dallgow-Döberitz and Ketzin. The towns, villages and municipalities on the plateau mainly lie in the two counties of Potsdam-Mittelmark and Havelland.

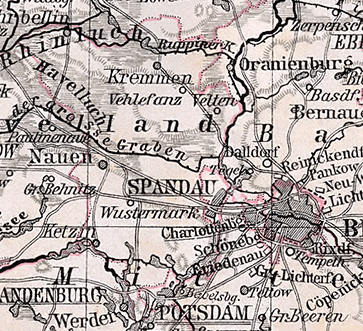
1905 map

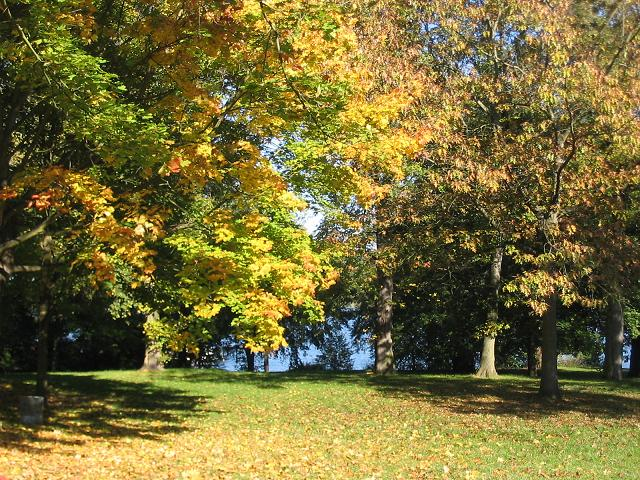
Outlier of the Havel in Berlin-Gatow

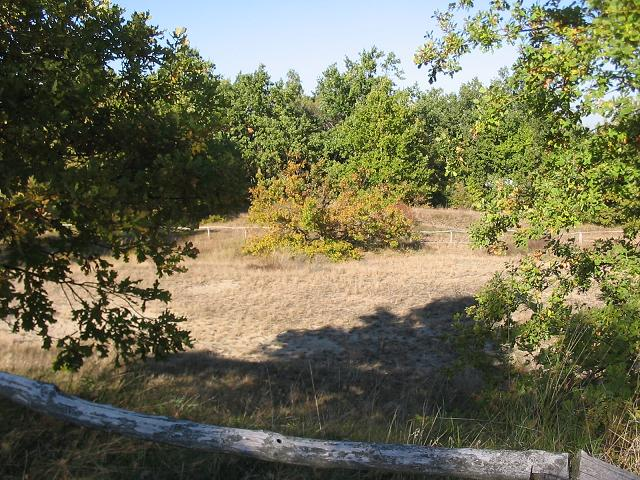
Windmühlenberg Nature Reserve in Gatow

The Nauen Plateau was designated as a region suitable for wind power; as a result the Ketzin Wind Park has been built here. It comprises eight 2.3 megawatt N90 turbines with a total output of 18.4 MW. The wind park with its 100-metre-high tubular towers joined the national grid in June 2005. In the years that followed, other facilities were installed. In July 2012 there were 21 wind generation facilities in Ketzin and Ketzin II with a total output of 48.5 MW. By April 2013 there were about 160 wind generators on the Nauen Plateau.

The former military training area of Döberitz Heath has now become a nature reserve and is home to a rare type of vegetation, dry, sandy, grassland flora. The Döberitz Heath and Ferbitzer Busch nature reserves together cover around 5,000 hectares (12,000 acres).

The Windmühlenberg Nature Reserve on the eastern slopes of the plateau above the River Havel in Gatow, a quarter of Berlin's Spandau borough, also supports dry, sandy, grassland flora.

== Geostructure ==
The ground moraine and terminal moraine depositions of the Nauen Plateau are partially overlain by marls and glacial sands, left behind by the waters of the thawing ice sheet about 15,000 years before the end of the Weichsel glaciation. The glacial shaping of the relief resulted in a succession of glacial drift, confined space in a change from clays, tills, sands and gravels. On the slopes of the plateau above the Havel lowlands, layers of sand, 10 metres thick, occur at the surface near Groß Glienicke, Kladow and Gatow, such as at the Gatow hill of Windmühlenberg, on the Gatow Heath or near Karolinenhöhe. The dry, nutrient-poor sand here is ideal for the extreme habitat needed for dry grassland.

The remaining soils on the surface of the Upper Pleistocene landscape area are dominated, on the one hand, by rusty brown earth (Braunerde) that, with good aeration and deep rooting forms similar habitats to that of the dry sands and nutrient-poor areas. On the other hand, parabraunerde soils, with their higher humus and clay content, such as those in the Gatower Feldflur Nature Reserve, offer the best conditions for agriculture.

== Literature ==
- Potsdam und Umgebung. Führer zur Geologie von Berlin und Brandenburg Nr. 4, Hrsg.: Johannes H. Schroeder, Selbstverlag Geowissenschaftler in Berlin und Brandenburg e.V., Berlin 2001, 2nd expanded edition, ISBN 3-928651-09-9
- R. Weiße, Die Potsdamer Glaziallandschaft – glazigene Sedimente und glaziäre Baustile, In: Brandenburgische Geowissenschaftliche Beiträge, Hrsg.: Landesamt für Bergbau, Geologie und Rohstoffe Brandenburg, Kleinmachnow, Issue 1 1995, pp. 13–26, ISSN 0947-1995
- Walter Behrmann, Die Umgebung Berlins nach morphologischen Formengruppen betrachtet, In: Die Erde, Vol. 1 1949/1950, pp. 93–122, Gesellschaft für Erdkunde zu Berlin, ISSN 0013-9998
