= Rhinluch =

Wetland area in Germany

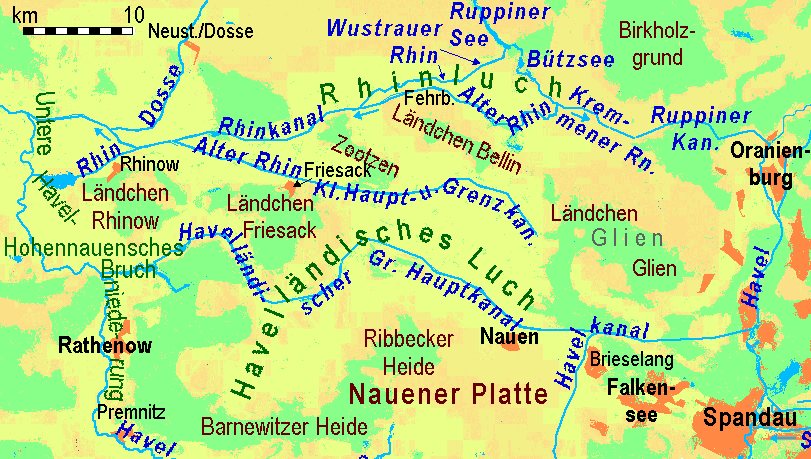
The Havelland Luch and the Rhinluch: Heights: yellow-green < 40 m to brownish > 45 m, woodland = green irrespective of height

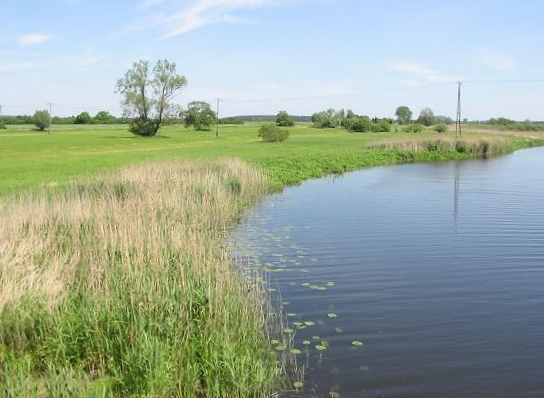
The Rhinluch and the Rhin near Wassersuppe, shortly before the Hohennauener See

The Rhinluch is a fen landscape in the German state of Brandenburg, bisected by the river Rhin to which it owes its name. This wetland region lies north of Fehrbellin in the county of Ostprignitz-Ruppin. The upper Rhinluch covers an area of about 23,000 hectares (57,000 acres). The suffix luch, from the west-Slavic "lug", meaning marshy ground, is used to describe several low-lying wet areas in the state of Brandenburg. In these areas, prior to the advent of modern drainage systems, water remained largely stagnant rather than flowing.

The Rhinluch was formed during the last ice age and its post-glacial period. About 16,000 years ago, the Eberswald urstromtal was formed by the meltwaters of the glacial ice sheet as they drained away to the sea. Later, this broad river valley dried up as the ice sheet retreated during the late ice age. In the land that makes up the present-day Rhinluch, lakes initially formed in individual places, especially where there were dead ice kettle holes. Over the course of time, these became bogs through the natural silting up process. In addition, during the post-glacial period, there was a widespread formation of swamps (Versumpfungsmooren) on the sands of the urstromtal. Not until man appeared, however, did these moors become pastures and meadows as a result of land improvement measures. The easternmost outlier of the Rhinluch is the Kremmener Luch.

The Rhinluch contains suitable habitat for the near threatened European pond turtle, whose population is stable in Brandenburg due to intensive conservation management of the Rhinluch and similar wetlands. The area is also known for its archaeological importance, as several well-preserved Mesolithic sites have been unearthed here.

The Brandenburg poet, Theodor Fontane, described the Rhinluch thus in his Wanderungen durch die Mark Brandenburg:

Just as the Havelland forms the centre of Old Brandenburg, so the Luch in turn is the centre of the Havelland. It is about fifty square miles in size; within these fifty square miles the two and twenty square miles of the Luchs are like a nut in a shell. The shape of this nut is not round, however, nor even oval or elliptical, but mushroom-shaped; like a mushroom with a short, fat stem, wide umbrella-shaped cap and a large cone-shaped root. A longitudinal section through such a mushroom illustrates the shape formed by the Luch. The Luch consists of two halves: an umbrella-shaped, northern half and a cone-shaped, southern half; the two coming near to one another, where the short stalk of the mushroom runs. The umbrella-shaped half is called the Rhinluch, the cone-shaped one, the Havelland Luch (Havelländische Luch). The land between the two that links them has no special name. This relatively narrow connecting strip that corresponds to the stem of the mushroom arose when the sandy plateaux to the left and right of the Luch bottom (Luchgrund) were pushed into the swamps. These sand plateaux bear well known names; the eastern one belongs to the historically renown Ländchen Bellin, the western one is called Ländchen Friesack. These two Ländchen ["little lands"] are old seats of culture, and their capitals, Fehrbellin and Friesack, were already named when both swamps still resembled lakes that, during the summer time, dried out into an unhealthy, unsafe swampland.
