= Battle of Nauen =

Battle in June, 1675

Skirmish at Nauen
- Part of Swedish-Brandenburg War
Date	17 June 1675
Location	Nauen in Brandenburg
Result	Brandenburgian victory

Belligerents
(yes) Swedish Empire	(Margraviate of Brandenburg) Brandenburg-Prussia

Commanders and leaders
(Swedish Empire) Wolmar Wrangel	(Margraviate of Brandenburg) Georg von Derfflinger

Strength
Unknown	Unknown

Casualties and losses
200 killed outside Nauen, (from 25 to 27 June (Greg.) total losses of about 600 killed and wounded and 600 captured)	60 killed

The Skirmish at Nauen (German: Gefecht bei Nauen or Duell vor Nauen), took place on 17 June [O.S. 27 June] 1675 near the town of Nauen between the vanguard of the Brandenburg-Prussian army and Swedish rearguard units during the Swedish-Brandenburg War.

The engagement ended with the capture of the town of Nauen by Brandenburg-Prussia. The decisive military victory in favour of Brandenburg, however, took place at the Battle of Fehrbellin on the following day.

== Background to the engagement ==
In December 1674 a Swedish army from Swedish Pomerania invaded the undefended March of Brandenburg and triggered the Swedish-Brandenburg War. However it was not until June 1675 that the Brandenburg army marched from Franconia, where it had been fighting the French as part of the Reichsarmee during the Franco-Dutch War, and returned home to liberate the occupied state.

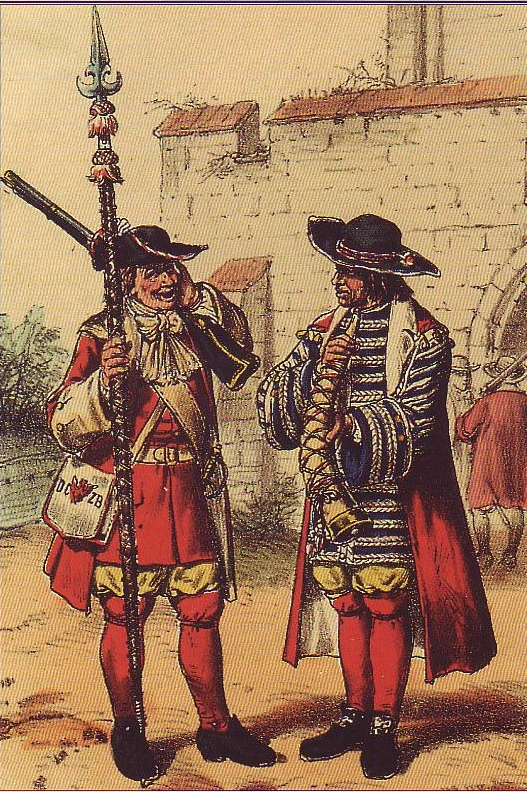
A Brandenburg soldier and shawm piper of Electress Dorothea's Own Infantry Regiment, ca. 1675

The operational objective of the Swedes under Field Marshal Wrangel was to set out from Havelberg to cross the Elbe in order to gain the left bank of the river, to join forces with Hanoverian troops and advance on Magdeburg. The Swedish field marshal dispatched a spearhead under the command of Colonel Wangelin to Rathenow, in order to secure the line of the river. The situation suddenly changed when the Brandenburg army succeed in recapturing this strategically important location at the Battle of Rathenow. This coup, which completely surprised the Swedes, meant that it was no longer possible for them to cross the Elbe at Havelberg.

After receiving news of the loss of Rathenow, the Swedish lieutenant general, Wolmar Wrangel, issued marching orders for the army to move through Nauen to capture the crossing of the Rhin near Fehrbellin. When the Elector learned of this, he took up their immediate pursuit.

== Skirmish at Nauen ==
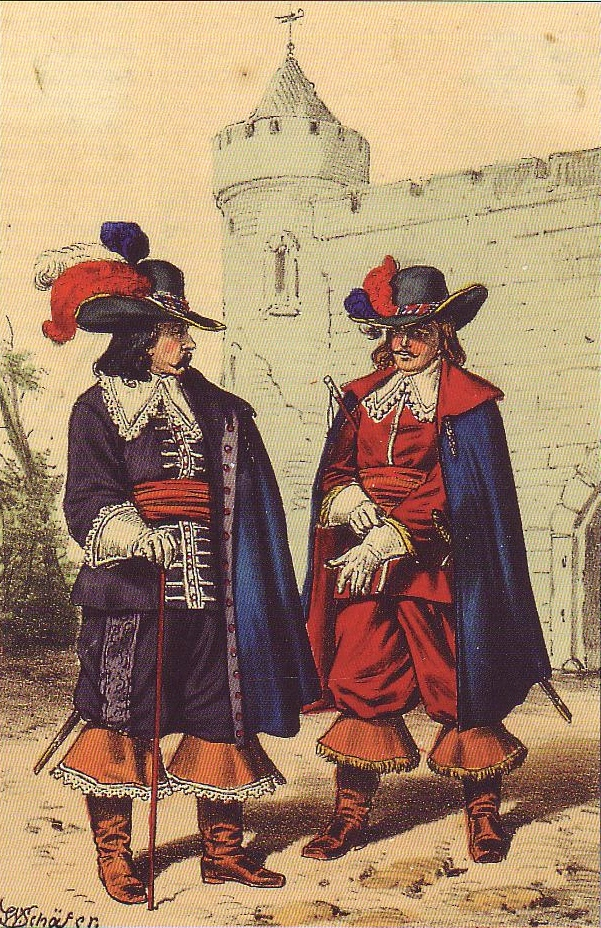
Brandenburg captain and lieutenant of Electress Dorothea's Own Infantry Regiment, ca. 1675

In the meantime, a 1,200 strong Brandenburg advance guard under Lieutenant Colonel Sydow had ridden at the gallop to a position covering Nauen. The lakeland in front of the town was only passable over a narrow causeway, so the Swedes had thrown up protective fieldworks, including several cannon, at a good defensive point. In spite of that, they offered no resistance when they saw a large number of enemy horsemen advancing on them. Instead, they tipped their cannon into the nearby lake and beat a hasty retreat. The fleeing soldiers were pursued by Brandenburg cavalry to the edge of the town of Nauen, suffering heavy losses.

The largest element of the Swedish contingent withdrew behind a stream beyond the town. A smaller element, a battalion of musketeers, occupied Nauen, meeting the advancing Brandenburgers with a fierce fire from their muskets and cannon. Nevertheless, even before they were reinforced by cannon and more dragoons in front of the town, 200 Brandenburg troopers succeeded in driving back a Swedish rearguard of 1,000 cuirassiers. In response, the Swedes rapidly surrendered the town of Nauen to Brandenburg and fled. During this further retreat, the pursuing Brandenburg cavalry inflicted further casualties on the Swedes.

Despite that, the Brandenburg cavalry could not capture the crossing over the stream behind the town. At the end of the bridge, the Swedes had erected a defensive position with several cannon. The fire from these guns forced the Brandenburgers to pull back with losses. Meanwhile, behind the Swedish fortification, the main Swedish army had deployed in order of battle. A division under Field Marshal Derfflinger succeeded, however, in repairing the bridge that had been damaged by enemy fire and in setting up three cannon that were able to destroy the Swedish guns at the fieldworks. Nevertheless, the enemy was in a good position, as before, so that a frontal assault would have been too fraught with risk. In addition, the Brandenburg troops were exhausted by their forced march. So the order was issued to pull back into and behind the town of Nauen and to pitch camp for the night.

== Result and impact on the Battle of Fehrbellin ==
By the evening of 17 June the two armies faced one another at close proximity. The Brandenburg side expected to open battle the next morning in front of the gates of Nauen. The Swedes however used the cover of night to withdraw towards Fehrbellin. The Elector and his army broke camp the next day at 5:30 a.m. in order to continue the pursuit.

The Swedes lost 200 men killed in fighting in and around Nauen.

"My little angel, we are dutifully pursuing the men of Sweden. They crossed the passes by Nauen this morning, but had to leave behind 200 of their rearguard dead; on the other side we have razed all the bridges near Fer-Berlin and occupied all the remaining passes, so that they cannot escape again from the land."

— General of Cavalry Frederick of Hesse-Homburg, Projekt Gutenberg, Theodor Fontane:Wanderungen durch die Mark Brandenburg in a letter to his wife

== See also ==
- Wars and battles involving Prussia

== Literature ==
- Curt Jany: Geschichte der Preußischen Armee – Vom 15. Jahrhundert bis 1914. Bd. 1, Biblio Verlag, Osnabrück 1967.
- Alois Straka:Schlacht bei Fehrbellin, 18. Juni 1675. Rat der Stadt, Fehrbellin 1987.
- Frank Bauer: Fehrbellin 1675 – Brandenburg-Preußens Aufstieg zur Großmacht. Potsdam 1998, ISBN 3-921655-86-2.
