= List of wars and battles involving Prussia =

Prussia and its predecessor, Brandenburg-Prussia, were involved in numerous conflicts during their existence as nation-states. During their military engagements they often fulfilled the role of a supporting power, especially in the 17th century. In the 18th century Prussia began to adopt an independent role in the conflicts of that time; at the latest by the time of the Silesian Wars.

Prussia's Army won major victories like at Leuthen, Leipzig, Waterloo, Königgrätz and Sedan but also suffered devastating defeats such as at Kunersdorf and Jena-Auerstedt.

This article lists all the wars and battles in which Brandenburg-Prussia and the Kingdom of Prussia were militarily engaged in before the founding of the German Empire, covering the period from 1618 to 1871.

== Wars ==
=== First Northern War (1656–1660) ===
The First Northern War (also Second or Little Northern War) was a conflict that took place from 1655 to 1661 between Poland, Sweden and Russia for supremacy in the Baltic states. Brandenburg fought initially on the side of Sweden against Poland, but changed sides, after Poland granted its prince-elector sovereignty over the Duchy of Prussia in the Treaty of Wehlau on 19 September 1657. Brandenburg succeeded in gaining ultimate sovereignty over the Duchy of Prussia and proved itself during the war as an important military and political power.

Battle	Date	Result
Battle of Warsaw	28–30 July 1656	Victory
Battle of Prostki	8 October 1656	Loss
Battle of Nyborg	14 November 1659	Victory

=== Franco-Dutch War and Swedish-Brandenburg War (1674–1679) ===
The Swedish-Brandenburg War was part of the Franco-Dutch War, and was a conflict between the Electorate of Brandenburg and Kingdom of Sweden for the domination of Pomerania. In this war, Sweden was an ally of France, whilst Brandenburg-Prussia, together with Austria, Denmark and Spain, fought on the side of the Dutch. At the end of 1674, Swedish troops invaded Brandenburg, but were successfully repulsed by the Brandenburg army.

Battle	Date	Result
Battle of Turckheim	5 January 1675	Loss
Battle of Rathenow	15 June 1675	Victory
Battle of Nauen	17 June 1675	Victory
Battle of Fehrbellin	18 June 1675	Victory
Siege of Wismar	1 August – 14 December 1675	Victory
Siege of Wolgast	1–10 November 1675	Victory
Bremen-Verden campaign	15 September 1675 – 13 August 1676	Victory
Siege of Stettin	16 September – 16 November 1676	Loss
Siege of Stettin	25 June – 15 December 1677	Victory
Battle of Warksow	18 January 1678	Loss
Invasion of Rügen	22–24 September 1678	Victory
Siege of Stralsund	20 September – 15 October 1678	Victory
Great Sleigh Drive	December 1678 – February 1679	Victory

=== Spanish-Brandenburg War (1680-1682) ===
Battle	Date	Result
Action of 30 September 1681	30 September 1681	Loss

=== Great Turkish War (1683–1699) ===
Battle	Date	Result
Siege of Buda	mid-June – 2 September 1686	Victory

=== Nine Years' War (1688–1697) ===
Battle	Date	Result
Siege of Bonn	July 1689 – 12 October 1689	Victory
Siege of Namur	2 July – 4 September 1695	Victory

=== Spanish War of Succession (1701–1714) ===
In the Crown Treaty signed on 16 November 1700, Elector Frederick III had undertaken to provide a body of 8,000 men for the impending Spanish War of Succession for Emperor Leopold I. In return, the emperor promised that Frederick's future self-coronation as "King in Prussia" would be recognised across Europe and the Holy Roman Empire. The coronation took place on 18 January 1701 in Königsberg and from April 1701 the now entitled Royal Prussian Contingent deployed to the Lower Rhine at Wesel. In April 1702 it took part in hostilities for the first time at the Siege of Kaiserswerth.

Battle	Date	Result
Siege of Kaiserswerth	18 April 1702 – 15 June 1702	Victory
First Battle of Höchstädt	20 September 1703	Loss
Second Battle of Höchstädt	13 August 1704	Victory
Battle of Cassano	16 August 1705	Loss
Battle of Turin	7 September 1706	Victory
Battle of Oudenaarde	11 July 1708	Victory
Battle of Malplaquet	11 September 1709	Victory

=== Great Northern War (1700–1721) ===
After the death of his father, King Frederick William I joined the coalition against the Swedish king, Charles XII, with the aim of capturing the Swedish territories in Pomerania. As a result, the Prussian occupied Stettin in 1713. In November 1714, when Charles XII took personal command of Swedish Pomerania, the Prussian Army, together with the Saxons and Danes, was able to force him back to Stralsund in 1715–16 during the Pomeranian campaign and besiege him there. After the end of the war Prussia gained Stettin, Usedom and all territories south of the Peene.

Battle	Date	Result
Siege of Stralsund	1 May – 24 December 1715	Victory
Battle of Stresow	16 November 1715	Victory

=== Austrian War of Succession (1740–1748) ===
==== First Silesian War (1740–1742) ====
In 1740, in the first year of his reign and shortly after his coronation Frederick II sent the Prussian Army to invade Austrian-ruled Silesia and so precipitated the First Silesian War and, in its broader sense, the Austrian War of Succession. Because Prussia allied itself with Bavaria, France, Saxony, the Electorate of Cologne, Spain, Sweden and Naples, whilst Prussia's main enemy, Austria allied itself with Great Britain, Sardinia, the Netherlands and Russia. For Prussia, the war was restricted to Silesia, and was able to capture the province after several victories.

Battle	Date	Result
Battle of Baumgarten	27 February 1741	Loss
Storming of Glogau	9 March 1741	Victory
Battle of Mollwitz	10 April 1741	Victory
Siege of Neisse	18–31 October 1741	Victory
Capitulation of Olmütz	27 December 1741	Victory
Siege of Glatz (1741)	9 January – 26 April 1741	Victory
Battle of Lesch	16 February 1742	
Battle of Chotusitz	17 May 1742	Victory

==== Second Silesian War (1744–1745) ====
The Second Silesian War was also part of the Austrian War of Succession, but also a war fought for supremacy in Silesia between Prussia and Austria. Frederick II had allied himself at that time with France. Austria formed an alliance with Saxony, Great Britain and the Netherlands. In August 1744, Prussia ambushed Bohemia with 80,000 soldiers and thereby opened the Second Silesian War. After several hard battles, it was agreed in the Treaty of Dresden that Silesia would always remain in Prussian hands.

Battle	Date	Result
Siege of Prague (1744)	6–16 September 1744	Victory
Siege of Tabor	20–23 October 1744	Loss
Storming of Budweis	23 October 1744	Loss
Battle of Teltschitz	19 November 1744	Loss
Battle of Pless	27 November 1744	Loss
Battle of Ratibor	9 February 1745	Victory
Battle of Habelschwerdt	14 February 1745	Victory
Battle of Hohenfriedberg	4 June 1745	Victory
Siege of Kosel	27 August – 5 September 1745	Victory
Battle of Soor	30 September 1745	Victory
Battle of Hennersdorf	23 November 1745	Victory
Battle of Zittau	27 November 1745	
Battle of Kesselsdorf	15 December 1745	Victory

=== Seven Years' War (1756–1763) ===
==== Third Silesian War (1756–1763) ====
The Seven Years' War, fought between Prussia and Great Britain on one side and Austria, France, Sweden and Russia on the other, involved all the great European powers of the time. In the Third Silesian War (the Austrian-Prussian theatre), Austria's goal was the reconquest of Silesia, but Frederick II pre-empted his enemies, and on 29 August 1756 crossed the border of Saxony without a prior declaration of war. Military success alternated and the Prussian army faced defeat in the end, in spite of major victories. On 15 February 1763 the Peace of Hubertusburg was signed between Prussia and its opponents. The status quo ante was restored. The war established Prussia as the fifth major power in Europe, but Prussia lost 180,000 soldiers during the war.

Battle	Date	Result
Siege of Pirna	11 September – 14 October 1756	Victory
Battle of Lobositz	1 October 1756	Victory
Battle of Reichenberg	21 April 1757	Victory
Battle of Prague (1757)	6 May 1757	Victory
Siege of Prague	May 1757	Loss
Battle of Kolín	18 June 1757	Loss
Siege of Memel	19-25 June 1757	Loss
Battle of Gross-Jägersdorf	30 August 1757	Loss
Battle of Moys	7 September 1757	Loss
1757 raid on Berlin	16 October 1757	Loss
Battle of Rossbach	5 November 1757	Victory
Battle of Breslau (1757)	22 November 1757	Loss
Battle of Leuthen	5 December 1757	Victory
Siege of Breslau (1757)	7–20 December 1757	Victory
Siege of Olomouc	4 May – 2 July 1758	Loss
Battle of Rheinberg	12 June 1758	Inconclusive
Battle of Krefeld	23 June 1758	Victory
Battle of Domstadtl	30 June 1758	Loss
Battle of Zorndorf	25 August 1758	Inconclusive
Battle of Tornow	26 September 1758	Victory
Battle of Fehrbellin (1758)	28 September 1758	Loss
Battle of Hochkirch	14 October 1758	Loss
Battle of Güstow	18 November 1758	Victory
Battle of Peterswalde	14–20 April 1759	Victory
Battle of Kay	23 July 1759	Loss
Battle of Kunersdorf	12 August 1759	Loss
Battle of Frisches Haff	10 September 1759	Loss
Battle of Hoyerswerda	25 September 1759	Victory
Siege of Kolberg	4 October – 1 November 1759	Victory
Battle of Maxen	20 November 1759	Loss
Battle of Meissen	4 December 1759	Loss
Battle of Landeshut (1760)	23 June 1760	Loss
Siege of Glatz	7 June – 26 July 1760	Loss
Siege of Dresden	July 1760	Loss
Battle of Liegnitz (1760)	15 August 1760	Victory
Battle of Strehla	20 August 1760	Victory
Siege of Kolberg	September 1760	Victory
Battle of Pasewalk	3 October 1760	Loss
Battle of Kloster Kampen	15 October 1760	Loss
Raid on Berlin	October 1760	Loss
Battle of Torgau	3 November 1760	Victory
Battle of Langensalza (1761)	15 February 1761	Victory
Siege of Cassel (1761)	March 1761	Loss
Battle of Grünberg	21 March 1761	Loss
Battle of Villinghausen	15–16 July 1761	Victory
Siege of Kolberg	22 August – 16 December 1761	Loss
Battle of Neuensund	18 September 1761	Loss
Battle of Neukalen	2 January 1762	Loss
Battle of Wilhelmsthal	24 June 1762	Victory
Battle of Burkersdorf	21 July 1762	Victory
Battle of Freiberg	29 October 1762	Victory

=== First Partition of Poland (1772) ===
Overall, Prussia gained 36,000 km^{2} and about 600,000 people. According to Jerzy Surdykowski Frederick the Great soon introduced German colonists on territories he conquered and engaged in Germanization of Polish territories.

=== War of the Bavarian Succession (1778–1779) ===
The War of the Bavarian Succession was fought between Prussia, Saxony and Bavaria on one side and Austria on the other.

=== Revolutionary and Napoleonic Wars (1792–1815) ===
The Revolutionary and Napoleonic Wars were a series of conflicts in the late 18th and early 19th centuries between Revolutionary France and later the French Empire and coalitions of various European states. Prussia was a member of three of the six anti-French coalitions.

==== War of the First Coalition (1792–1795) ====
The War of the First Coalition saw the monarchies of Europe, led by Austria, opposed to revolutionary France. It lasted from 1793 to 1797, though Prussia made peace in 1795.

Battle	Date	Result
Siege of Thionville	24 August – 16 October 1792	Loss
Siege of Verdun	29 August – 2 September 1792	Victory
Battle of Valmy	20 September 1792	Loss
Siege of Mainz	14 April – 23 July 1793	Victory
Siege of Landau	20 August – 23 December 1793	Loss
Battle of Pirmasens	14 September 1793	Victory
Battle of Biesingen	17 November 1793	Victory
Battle of Kaiserslautern	28–30 November 1793	Victory
Second Battle of Wissembourg	26–29 December 1793	Loss
Battle of Kaiserslautern	23 May 1794	Victory
Battle of Trippstadt	13–17 July 1794	Loss

==== War of the Fourth Coalition (1806–1807) ====
The War of the Fourth Coalition saw Prussia and her allies in conflict with France over concerns about the formation of the Confederation of the Rhine and the expansion of Napoleon's influence into Germany. It ended with the defeat of the coalition a year later.

Battle	Date	Result
Battle of Schleiz	9 October 1806	Loss
Battle of Saalfeld	10 October 1806	Loss
Battle of Jena and Auerstedt	14 October 1806	Loss
Capitulation of Erfurt	16 October 1806	Loss
Battle of Halle	17 October 1806	Loss
Siege of Magdeburg (1806)	25 October – 8 November 1806	Loss
Fall of Berlin (1806)	27 October 1806	Loss
Battle of Prenzlau	28 October 1806	Loss
Capitulation of Pasewalk	29 October 1806	Loss
Capitulation of Stettin	29–30 October 1806	Loss
Battle of Waren-Nossentin	1 November 1806	Victory
Greater Poland uprising (1806)	November 1806	Loss
Battle of Lübeck	6 November 1806	Loss
Siege of Hamelin	7–22 November 1806	Loss
Battle of Czarnowo	23 December 1806	Loss
Siege of Graudenz	22 January – 11 December 1807	Inconclusive
Battle of Mohrungen	25 January 1807	Loss
Battle of Eylau	7–8 February 1807	Inconclusive
Siege of Kolberg	14 March – 2 July 1807	Inconclusive
Siege of Danzig	19 March – 24 May 1807	Loss
Battle of Guttstadt-Deppen	5–6 June 1807	Victory
Battle of Heilsberg	10 June 1807	Inconclusive

==== War of the Sixth Coalition (1813–1814) ====
The War of the Sixth Coalition saw a re-vitalized Prussia join the allies against the French in 1813, resulting in France's defeat in 1814. The German campaign covers all the military engagements that took place from 1813 to 1815 between the troops of Napoleonic France and the allies, consisting of Prussia, Austria, Russia, Sweden and Great Britain. After the liberation of the German nations, the winter campaign of 1814 ended with the abdication of Napoleon and the First Treaty of Paris.

Battle	Date	Result
Siege of Danzig (1813)	16 January – 29 November 1813	Victory
Battle of Möckern	5 April 1813	Victory
Battle of Lützen	2 May 1813	Loss
Battle of Bautzen	20–21 May 1813	Loss
Battle of Haynau	26 May 1813	Victory
Battle of Luckau	4 June 1813	Victory
Battle of Großbeeren	23 August 1813	Victory
Battle of Katzbach	26 August 1813	Victory
Battle of Dresden	26–27 August 1813	Loss
Battle of Hagelberg	27 August 1813	Victory
Battle of Kulm	29–30 August 1813	Victory
Battle of Dennewitz	6 September 1813	Victory
Battle of the Göhrde	16 September 1813	Victory
Battle of Altenburg	28 September 1813	Victory
Battle of Wartenburg	3 October 1813	Victory
Battle of Leipzig	16–19 October 1813	Victory
Battle of Arnhem (1813)	30 November 1813	Victory
Siege of Metz (1814)	3 January – 10 April 1814	Inconclusive
Battle of Hoogstraten	11 January 1814	Victory
Siege of Antwerp (1814)	14 January – 4 May 1814	Victory
Battle of Brienne	29 January 1814	Loss
Battle of La Rothière	1 February 1814	Victory
Battle of Montmirail	11 February 1814	Loss
Battle of Château Thierry	12 February 1814	Loss
Battle of Vauchamps	14 February 1814	Loss
Battle of Gué-à-Tresmes	28 February – 1 March 1814	Loss
Battle of Craonne	7 March 1814	Loss
Battle of Laon	9–10 March 1814	Victory
Battle of Reims (1814)	12–13 March 1814	Loss
Battle of Arcis-sur-Aube	20–21 March 1814	Victory
Battle of Fère-Champenoise	25 March 1814	Victory
Battle of Paris	30–31 March 1814	Victory
Battle of Courtrai (1814)	31 March 1814	Loss

==== War of the Seventh Coalition (1815) ====
The War of the Seventh Coalition, also called the Hundred Days, occurred in the summer of 1815. Following the short-lived return of Napoleon, his reign was finally ended following his defeat against Great Britain and their Prussian allies in the Waterloo Campaign.

Battle	Date	Result
Battle of Ligny	16 June 1815	Loss
Battle of Waterloo	18 June 1815	Victory
Battle of Wavre	18–19 June 1815	Tactical defeat, strategic victory
Battle of Rocquencourt	1 July 1815	Loss
Battle of Issy	2–3 July 1815	Victory

=== First Schleswig War (1848–1851) ===
The First Schleswig War was the first military conflict over the Schleswig-Holstein question, which was about who should rule over the Duchy of Schleswig. The warring parties were, on the one hand the German movement in the duchies of Schleswig and Holstein in conjunction with the majority of nations in the German Confederation (including Prussia), and on the other hand the State of Denmark. This war ended in a decisive Danish victory, but 13 years later the next war broke out.

Battle	Date	Remarks
Battle of Dybbøl (1848)	5 June 1848	Loss
Battle of Kolding (1849)	12 April 1849	Victory
Skirmish of Århus	31 May 1849	Loss

=== Second Schleswig War (1864) ===
The Second Schleswig War (also the German-Danish War) was a military conflict for the Duchy of Schleswig between the German Confederation and the Kingdom of Denmark. The war ended with the defeat of the Danes. The two victorious powers, Austria and Prussia, initially owned and ruled jointly over the duchies of Schleswig, Holstein and Lauenburg. The strained relationship between the two states worsened however in the period that followed, until finally the Austro-Prussian War broke out in 1866.

Battle	Date	Remarks
Battle of Mysunde	2 February 1864	Loss
Battle of Jasmund	17 March 1864	Loss
Battle of Dybbøl	18 April 1864	Victory
Battle of Heligoland	9 May 1864	Inconclusive
Battle of Als	29 June 1864	Victory
Battle of Lundby	3 July 1864	Victory

=== Austro-Prussian War (1866) ===
The Austro-Prussian War was a military conflict between Austria and Prussia. The war was fought for supremacy in the German lands (aside from Switzerland). It ended with a victory for Prussia (and its allies) over Austria (and its allies) and the dissolution of the German Confederation. Prussia thereby assumed political supremacy over Austria amongst the German nations and founded the North German Confederation.

Battle	Date	Result
Battle of Hühnerwasser	26 June 1866	Victory
Battle of Podol	26–27 June 1866	Victory
Battle of Trautenau	27–28 June 1866	Loss
Battle of Nachod	27 June 1866	Victory
Battle of Langensalza	27 June 1866	Loss
Battle of Skalitz	28 June 1866	Victory
Battle of Münchengrätz	28 June 1866	Victory
Battle of Gitschin	29 June 1866	Victory
Battle of Königinhof	29 June 1866	Victory
Battle of Schweinschädel	29 June 1866	Victory
Battle of Königgrätz	3 July 1866	Victory
Battle of Dermbach	4 July 1866	Victory
Battle of Kissingen	10 July 1866	Victory
Battle of Frohnhofen	13 July 1866	Victory
Battle of Aschaffenburg	14 July 1866	Victory
Battle of Blumenau	22 July 1866	Victory
Battle of Hundheim	23 July 1866	Victory
Battle of Tauberbischofsheim	24 July 1866	Victory
Battle of Werbach	24 July 1866	Victory
Battle of Gerchsheim	25 July 1866	Victory
Battle of Helmstadt	25 July 1866	Victory
Battle of Roßbrunn	26 July 1866	Loss

=== Franco-Prussian War (1870–1871) ===
Battle	Date	Result
Battle of Saarbrücken	2 August 1870	Loss
Battle of Wissembourg	4 August 1870	Victory
Battle of Spicheren	6 August 1870	Victory
Battle of Wörth	6 August 1870	Victory
Siege of Bitche	6 August 1870 – 26 March 1871	Victory
Siege of Lichtenberg	9–10 August 1870	Victory
Siege of Phalsbourg	10 August 1870 – 12 December 1870	Victory
Siege of Marsal	13–14 August 1870	Victory
Battle of Colombey	14 August 1870	Inconclusive
Siege of Strasbourg	14 August 1870 – 28 September 1870	Victory
Battle of Mars-la-Tour	16 August 1870	Inconclusive
Siege of Toul	16 August 1870 – 23 September 1870	Victory
Battle of Gravelotte	18 August 1870	Victory
Siege of Metz	20 August – 27 October 1870	Victory
Battle of Buzancy	27 August 1870	Victory
Battle of Beaumont	30 August 1870	Victory
Battle of Noisseville	31 August – 1 September 1870	Victory
Battle of Sedan	1–2 September 1870	Victory
Siege of Paris	19 September 1870 – 28 January 1871	Victory
Battle of Chevilly	30 September 1870	Victory
Battle of Bellevue	7 October 1870	Victory
Battle of Châtillon	13 October 1870	Victory
Battle of Buzenval (1870)	21 October 1870	Victory
Battle of Le Bourget	27–30 October 1870	Victory
Siege of Belfort	3 November 1870 – 18 February 1871	Victory
Battle of Havana	9 November 1870	Inconclusive
Battle of Amiens	27 November 1870	Victory
Battle of Beaune-la-Rolande	28 November 1870	Victory
Battle of Villiers	29 November – 3 December 1870	Victory
Battle of Loigny–Poupry	2 December 1870	Victory
Battle of Beaugency	8–10 December 1870	Victory
Battle of Hallue	23–24 December 1870	Inconclusive
Battle of Bapaume	3 January 1871	Loss
Battle of Villersexel	9 January 1871	Loss
Battle of Le Mans	10–12 January 1871	Victory
Battle of the Lisaine	15–17 January 1871	Victory
Battle of St. Quentin	19 January 1871	Victory
Battle of Buzenval	19–20 January 1871	Victory

== See also ==
- German Army (German Empire)
- List of wars involving Germany
- List of wars involving the Holy Roman Empire
- Prussia

== Literature ==
- Curt Jany: Geschichte of the Preußischen Armyvom 15.Jahrhundert bis 1914. Biblio Verlag, Osnabrück, 1967.
- O. Büsch, W. Neugebauer: Moderne Preußische Geschichte 1648–1947. Vol. 2, 4th Pt. Militärsystem and Gesellschaftsordnung. Verlag de Gruyter, 1981, p. 749–871, ISBN 3-11-008324-8.
- Martin Guddat: Handbuch zur Prussian Militärgeschichte 1701–1786. Verlag Mittler, Hamburg, 2001, ISBN 3-8132-0732-3.
- Karl-Volker Neugebauer: Grundzüge of the German Militärgeschichte. Band 1: Historischer Überblick. 1st edition, Rombach Verlag, Freiburg, 1993, ISBN 3-7930-0662-6.
