= Swedish invasion of Brandenburg =

1674–75 campaign of the Scanian War

- Part of the Scanian War (Northern Wars); Franco-Dutch War
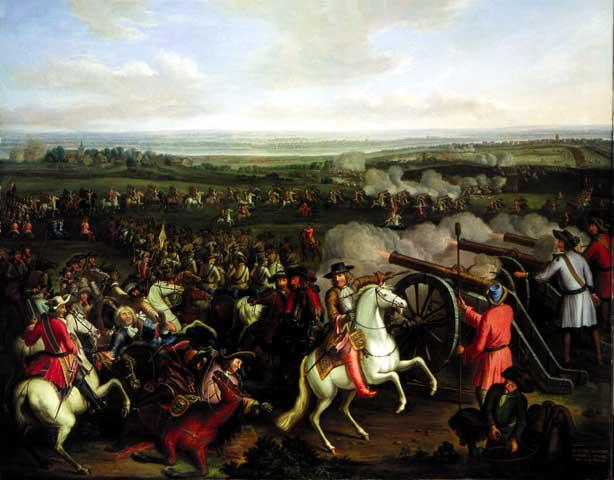
- Battle of Fehrbellin by Dismar Degen.
Date	25 December 1674 – 28 June 1675
Location	Brandenburg, Germany
Result	Brandenburger victory

Belligerents
Swedish Empire	Brandenburg-Prussia

Commanders and leaders
Carl Gustaf Wrangel; Waldemar von Wrangel	Frederick William; Georg von Derfflinger

Strength
January 1675: 13,000–13,700; May 1675: 11,000–12,000	Garrison troops: 5,000; Relief force: 15,000

Casualties and losses
June–July 1675: 4,000 (1,100–1,500 combat losses)	June–July 1675: Unknown (600–1,000 combat losses)

The Swedish invasion of Brandenburg (1674–75) (German: Schwedeneinfall 1674/75) involved the occupation of the undefended Margraviate of Brandenburg by a Swedish army launched from Swedish Pomerania during the period 26 December 1674 to the end of June 1675. The Swedish invasion sparked the Swedish-Brandenburg War that, following further declarations of war by European powers allied with Brandenburg, expanded into a North European conflict that did not end until 1679.

The trigger for the Swedish invasion was the participation of a 20,000 strong Brandenburg Army in the Holy Roman Empire's war on France as part of the Franco-Dutch War. As a result, Sweden, a traditional ally of France, occupied the militarily unprotected margraviate with the declared aim of forcing the Elector of Brandenburg, Frederick William, to sue for peace with France. In early June 1675 the Elector and his 15,000 strong army decamped at Schweinfurt in Franconia, now southern Germany, and reached the city of Magdeburg on 21 [O.S. 11] June 1675. Frederick William, led the campaign against a Swedish force of between 11,000 and 12,000 men. After one week the Swedish troops had retreated from the Margraviate of Brandenburg.

== Background ==
After the War of Devolution, Louis XIV, King of France, pressed for retribution against the States-General. He initiated diplomatic activities with the aim of isolating Holland completely. To that end, on 24 April 1672 in Stockholm, France concluded a secret treaty with Sweden that bound the Scandinavian power to contribute 16,000 troops against any German state that gave military support to the Republic of Holland.

Immediately thereafter, in June 1672, Louis XIV invaded the States-General - thus sparking the Franco-Dutch War - and advanced to just short of Amsterdam. The Elector of Brandenburg, in accordance with treaty provisions, supported the Dutch in the fight against France with 20,000 men in August 1672. In December 1673, Brandenburg-Prussia and Sweden concluded a ten-year defensive alliance. However, both sides reserved freedom to choose their alliances in the event of war. Because of his defensive alliance with Sweden, during the period that followed the Elector of Brandenburg did not expect Sweden to enter the war on the French side. And despite the separate Treaty of Vossem agreed between Brandenburg and France on 16 June 1673, Brandenburg rejoined the war against France in the following year, when the emperor of the Holy Roman Empire declared an imperial war (Reichskrieg) against France in May 1674.

On 23 August 1674, therefore, a 20,000 strong Brandenburg army marched out again from the Margraviate of Brandenburg heading for Strasbourg. Elector Frederick William and Electoral Prince Charles Emil of Brandenburg accompanied this army. John George II of Anhalt-Dessau was appointed Statthalter ("Governor") of Brandenburg.

Through bribes and by promising subsidies France now succeeded in persuading its traditional allies, Sweden, which had only escaped losing all of Pomerania with France's intervention in the Treaty of Oliva in 1660, to enter the war against Brandenburg. The decisive factor was the concern of the Swedish royal court that a French defeat would result in the political isolation of Sweden. The goal of Sweden's entry into the war was to occupy the undefended state of Brandenburg in order to force Brandenburg-Prussia to withdraw its troops from war zones in the Upper Rhine and the Alsace.

== Preparations for war ==
Chronology:

1674

- 25 December – Invasion of the Uckermark by Sweden

1675

- from 4 February – Occupation of the Neumark and Hither Pomerania; followed by establishment of winter quarters
- Early May – Start of the Swedish spring campaign
- 15 May – 21 June – Battle of Löcknitz, breakthrough the Rhine line; occupation of all Havelland
- 6 June – Decampment of the Brandenburg Army from Franconia
- 21 June – Brandenburg Army reaches Magdeburg
- 22 June – Swedish advance party reaches Havelberg; the main body remains in Brandenburg (Havel)
- 25 June Brandenburg ambush at Rathenow
- 26 June – First Battle of Fehrbellin
- 27 June – Battle of Nauen
- 28 June – Battle of Fehrbellin

The Swedes then began to assemble an invasion force in Swedish Pomerania. From September more and more reports of these troops movements were received in Berlin. In particular, the Governor of Brandenburg notified his Elector in early September of a conversation with the Swedish envoy, Wangelin, in which he had announced that about 20,000 Swedish troops would be available in Pomerania before the end of the month. The news of an impending attack by the Swedish army grew stronger when, in the second half of October, the arrival in Wolgast of the Swedish commander-in-chief, Carl Gustav Wrangel, was reported.

John George II of Anhalt-Dessau, clearly troubled by news of the troop build-up, asked Field Marshal Carl Gustav Wrangel several times in late October, through Brandenburg colonel, Mikrander for the reasons for these troop movements. Wrangel, however, failed to answer and refused another attempt at dialogue by the Prince of Anhalt In mid-November the governor, John George II, had received assurance of an impending Swedish invasion, but in Berlin the exact causes and motives for such imminent aggression remained unclear.

In spite of the disturbing news coming from Berlin, Frederick William himself did not believe that there was an imminent Swedish invasion of the Margraviate of Brandenburg. He expressed this in a letter to the Governor of Brandenburg on 31 October 1674, which stated: "I consider the Swedes better than that and do not think they will do such a dastardly thing."

The strength of the assembled Swedish invasion army in Swedish Pomerania before they entered the Uckermark at the end of December 1674 was, according to the contemporary sources in the Theatrum Europaeum as follows:

- Infantry: eleven regiments with a total of 7,620 men.
- Cavalry: eight regiments, totalling 6,080 men.
- Artillery: 15 cannon of various calibres.

The forces available on 23 August 1674 to defend the Margraviate of Brandenburg, following the departure of its main army for Alsace, were pitiful. The Elector had few soldiers, and they were mainly old or disabled. The few combat-capable units at his disposal were stationed in fortresses as garrison troops. The overall strength of the garrison troops that the Governor had at his disposal at the end of August 1674 was only around 3,000 men. In the capital city, Berlin, there were at the time only 500 older soldiers, left behind due to their limited fighting ability, and 300 new recruits. The recruitment of fresh troops had therefore to be enforced immediately. In addition, the Elector ordered the Governor to issue a general call up to the rural population and the towns and cities, in order to compensate for the lack of trained soldiers. The so-called Landvolkaufgebot ("people's call up") went back to medieval legal standards in the state of Brandenburg, by which farmers and citizens could be used in case of need for local defence. But only after protracted negotiations between the Imperial Estates, towns and cities on the one hand and the privy councillors and the Governor on the other hand did the state succeed at the end of December 1674 in enforcing the call up. Most of this edict was applied in the residenz towns of Cölln, Berlin and Friedrichswerder (8 companies of 1,300 men). It was also successfully employed in the Altmark to mobilize farmers and heathland rangers (mounted forestry personnel familiar with the terrain) and for defence. The governor received more reinforcements at the end of January 1675 through the dispatch of troops from the Westphalian provinces.

== Invasion ==
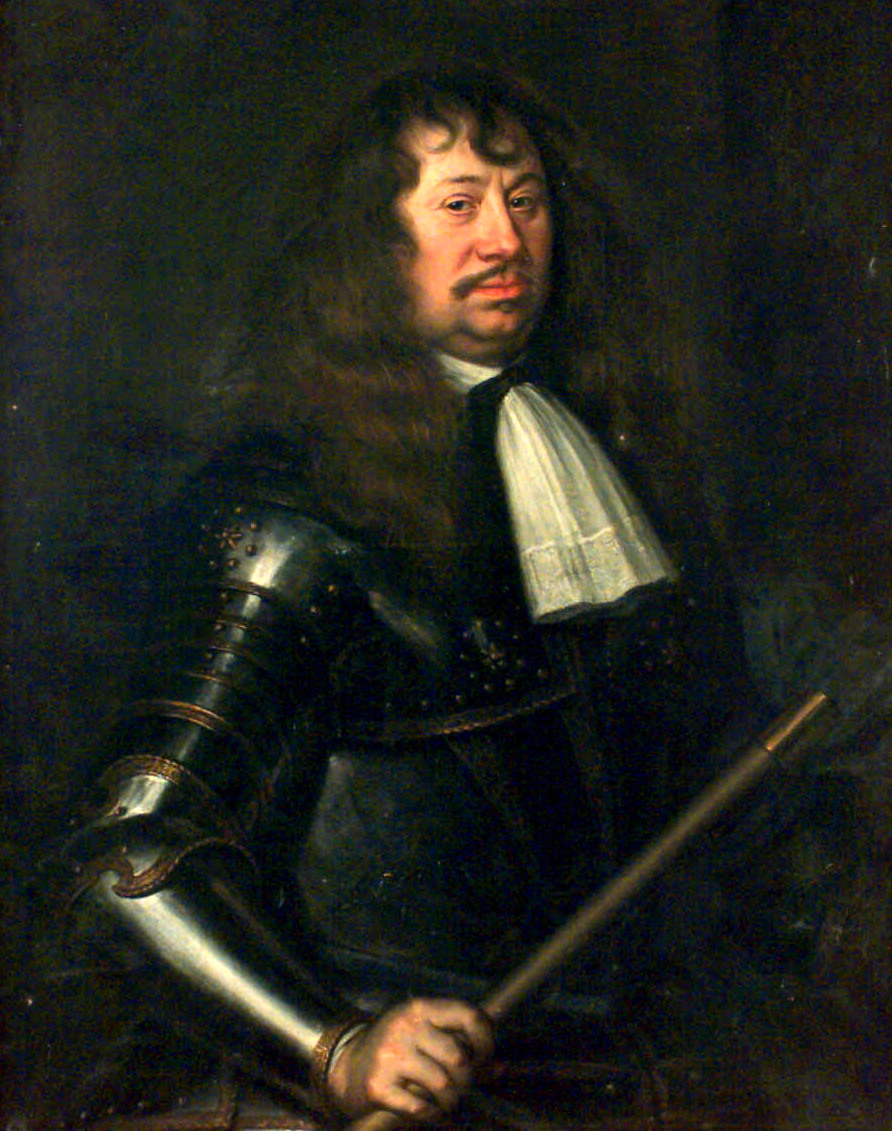
Field Marshal Carl Gustav Wrangel, Commander-in-Chief of the Swedish Army. Painting by Matthäus Merian the Younger, 1662

=== Occupation of the Margraviate (25 December 1674 – April 1675) ===
On 15/25 December 1674 Swedish troops marched through Pasewalk and invaded the Uckermark without a formal declaration of war. In fact, according to a message from the Swedish field marshal, Carl Gustav Wrangel, to the Brandenburg envoy, Dubislav von Hagen, on 20/30 December 1674, the Swedish Army would leave the Mark of Brandenburg as soon as Brandenburg ended its state of war with France. A complete break of relations between Sweden and Brandenburg was not intended however.

Figures relating the initial strength of this army, almost half of which was to consist of Germans by spring, vary in the sources between 13,000 and 13,700 men and 15 guns.

To support Field Marshal Carl Gustav Wrangel, who was over 60 years old, often bedridden and suffering from gout, field marshals Simon Grundel-Helmfelt and Otto Wilhelm von Königsmarck were appointed alongside him. However, this unclear assignment prevented, inter alia, clear orders being issued, so that directions for the movement of the army were only put into effect very slowly.

The entry of Sweden into the war attracted the general attention of European powers. The military glory of the Thirty Years' War had made the military power of Sweden seem overpowering in the eyes of her contemporaries. German mercenaries willingly offered their services to the Swedes. Some German states (Bavaria, the Electorate of Saxony, Hanover, and the Bishopric of Münster) agreed to join the Swedish–French alliance.

The Swedish Army established its headquarters at Prenzlau. It was joined there another department, established in Swedish Bremen-Verden, under General Dalwig.

At the same time, after the defeat of imperial Brandenburg in the Battle of Turckheim against the French on 26 December 1674, Brandenburg's main army marched to its winter quarters in and around Schweinfurt, reaching the area on 31 January 1675. Because of wintry weather and the losses he had suffered, the Elector decided that he would not deploy his main army immediately on a new campaign in the Uckermark. In addition, a sudden withdrawal from the western theatre of war would have alarmed Brandenburg-Prussia's allies – thus achieving the ultimate goal of the Swedish invasion, i.e. to force Brandenburg to withdraw from the war with France.

Without further reinforcements the open regions of the Neumark east of the Oder and Farther Pomerania could not be held by Brandenburg, except at a few fortified locations. The Mittelmark, by contrast, could be held with relatively few troops, because to the north there were only a few easily defended passes, near Oranienburg, Kremmen, Fehrbellin and Friesack, through the marshlands of the Havelland Luch and the Rhinluch. In the east, the March was covered by the river course of the Oder. The few available Brandenburg soldiers were recalled to fortified locations. In this way, as a result of the prevailing circumstances, Brandenburg's defences were formed along the line from Köpenick, via Berlin, Spandau, Oranienburg, Kremmen, Fehrbellin and Havelberg to the River Elbe. In addition the garrison of Spandau Fortress was reinforced from 250 to 800 men; it also had 24 cannon of varying calibres. In Berlin the garrison was increased to 5,000 men, including the Leibdragoner ("dragoon bodyguard") dispatched by the Elector from Franconia and the reinforcements sent from the province of Westphalia at the end of January.

The Swedes, however, remained inactive and failed to take advantage of the absence of the Brandenburg army and occupy wide areas of the Margraviate of Brandenburg. They focused first – whilst maintaining strict discipline – on the levying of war contributions and on building up the army. This inaction was partially due to the internal political conflict between the old and the new government of Sweden, which prevented clear military aims being set. Contradictory orders were issued; command was soon followed by counter-command.

At the end of January 1675, Carl Gustav Wrangel assembled his forces near Prenzlau and, on 4 February, crossed the Oder with his main body heading for Pomerania and Neumark. Swedish troops occupied Stargard in Pommern, Landsberg, Neustettin, Kossen, and Züllichau in order to recruit there as well. Farther Pomerania was occupied as far as Lauenburg and several smaller places. Then Wrangel settled the Swedish army into winter quarters in Pomerania and the Neumark.

When it became clear in the early spring that Brandenburg-Prussia would not withdraw from the war, the Swedish court in Stockholm issued the order for a stricter regime of occupation to be enforced in order to raise pressure on the Elector to pull out of the war. This change in Swedish occupation policy followed swiftly, with the result that repression of the state and the civilian population increased sharply. Several contemporary chroniclers described these excesses as worse, both in extent and brutality, than during the Thirty Years' War. There was no significant fighting, however, until spring 1675. The Statthalter of the March of Brandenburg, John George II of Anhalt-Dessau, described this state of limbo in a letter to the Elector on 24 March/3 April 1675 as "neither peace nor war".

=== Swedish spring campaign (early May 1675 – 25 June 1675) ===
The French envoy in Stockholm demanded on 20/30 March that the Swedish Army extend its occupation to Silesia and conduct itself in agreement with French plans. The French position changed, however, in the weeks that followed and gave the Swedes more leeway in decision making in this theatre. However the envoy in Stockholm expressed concern due to the alleged failure of the Swedish troops.

In early May 1675 the Swedes began the spring campaign that had been strongly urged by the French. They had been recruiting soldiers, but suffered losses due to disease and desertion. One infantry regiment (1,100 men) and eight companies of horse had also been relocated elsewhere. The total army number available for the upcoming campaign had thus shrunk to between 11,000 and 12,000 men, by 10 May.

Wrangel's goal was to cross the Elbe to link up with Swedish forces in Bremen-Verden and the 13,000 strong army of their ally, John Frederick, Duke of Brunswick and Lunenburg, in order to cut the approach route of the Elector and his army into Brandenburg. The Swedish army entered the Uckermark, passing through Stettin; although the capability of it was not comparable to that of earlier times, the former view of Sweden's military might remained. This led, not least, to rapid early success. The first fighting took place in the region of Löcknitz where, on 5/15 May 1675, the fortified castle held by a 180-man garrison under Colonel Götz was surrendered after a day's shelling to the Swedish Army under the command of Oberwachtmeister Jobst Sigismund, in return for free passage to Oderburg. As a result, Götz was later sentenced to death by a court martial and executed on 24 March 1676.

Following the capture of Löcknitz, the Swedes pushed rapidly south and occupied Neustadt, Wriezen and Bernau. Their next objective was the Rhinluch, which was only passable in a few places. These had been occupied by Brandenburg with militia (Landjäger), armed farmers and heath rangers (Heidereitern) as a precaution. The governor (Statthalter) sent troops from Berlin and six cannon as reinforcements under the command of Major General von Sommerfeld in order to be able to mount a coordinated defence of the passes at Oranienburg, Kremmen and Fehrbellin.

The Swedes advanced on the Rhin line in three columns: the first, under General Stahl, against Oranienburg; the second, under General Dalwig, against Kremmen; and the third, which at 2,000 men was the strongest, under General Groothausen, against Fehrbellin. There was heavy fighting for the river crossing for several days in front of Fehrbellin. Because the Swedes did not succeed in breaking through here, the column diverted to Oranienburg, where, thanks to advice from local farmers, a crossing had been found which enabled about 2,000 Swedes to press on to the south. As a consequence, the positions on either side at Kremmen, Oranienburg and Fehrbellin had to be abandoned by Brandenburg.

Shortly thereafter, the Swedes mounted an unsuccessful storming of Spandau Fortress. The whole Havelland was now occupied by the Swedes, whose headquarters was initially established in the town of Brandenburg. After the capture of Havelberg the Swedish HQ was moved to Rheinsberg on 8/18 June.

Field Marshal Carl Gustav Wrangel, who left Stettin on 26 May/6 June to follow the army, only made it as far Neubrandenburg, because a severe attack of gout left him bedridden for 10 days. Overall command was devolved to Lieutenant General Wolmar Wrangel. To make matters worse, disunity broke out amongst the generals, resulting in general discipline in the army being lost and serious plundering and other abuses by the soldiery against the civil population took place. So that the troops could continue to be supplied with the necessary food and provision, their quarters were widely separated. As a result of this interruption the Swedes lost two valuable weeks in crossing the Elbe.

Sick and borne on a sedan chair, Field Marshal Carl Gustav Wrangel finally reached Neuruppin on 9/19 June. He immediately banned all looting and ordered reconnaissance detachments to be sent towards Magdeburg. On 11/21 June, he set out with a regiment of infantry and two cavalry regiments (1,500 horse) for Havelberg, which he reached the following day in order to occupy the Altmark that summer. To that end, he had all available craft assembled on the River Havel in order to construct a pontoon bridge across the Elbe.

At the same time he gave orders to his stepbrother, Lieutenant General Wolmar Wrangel, to bring up the main army and advance with him over the bridge at Rathenow towards Havelberg. Lieutenant General Wrangel, commander-in-chief of the main body, was at this time in the city of Brandenburg an der Havel. The communication link between Havelberg and Brandenburg an der Havel was held by just one regiment at Rathenow. This flank, secured only by a small force, offered a good point of attack for an enemy advancing from the west. At this time, on 21 June, a majority of the March of Brandenburg was in Swedish hands. However, the planned Swedish crossing of the Elbe at Havelberg on 27 June never came to fruition.

In the meantime, Frederick William tried to secure allies, knowing full well that the national forces at his disposal were, on their own, not sufficient for a campaign against the military might of Sweden. For this purpose, he went on 9 March for talks at The Hague, which he reached on 3 May. The negotiations and necessary appointments with the friendly powers gathered there lasted until 20 May. As a result, Holland and Spain declared war on Sweden at the urging of the Elector. Apart from that, he received no concrete assistance from the Holy Roman Empire or Denmark, whereupon the Elector decided to retake the March of Brandenburg from the Swedes without assistance. On 6 June 1675 he held a military parade and had the army break camp from its quarters on the River Main. The advance of the 15,000 strong army to Magdeburg was undertaken in three columns.

=== Campaign by Elector Frederick William (23–29 June 1675) ===
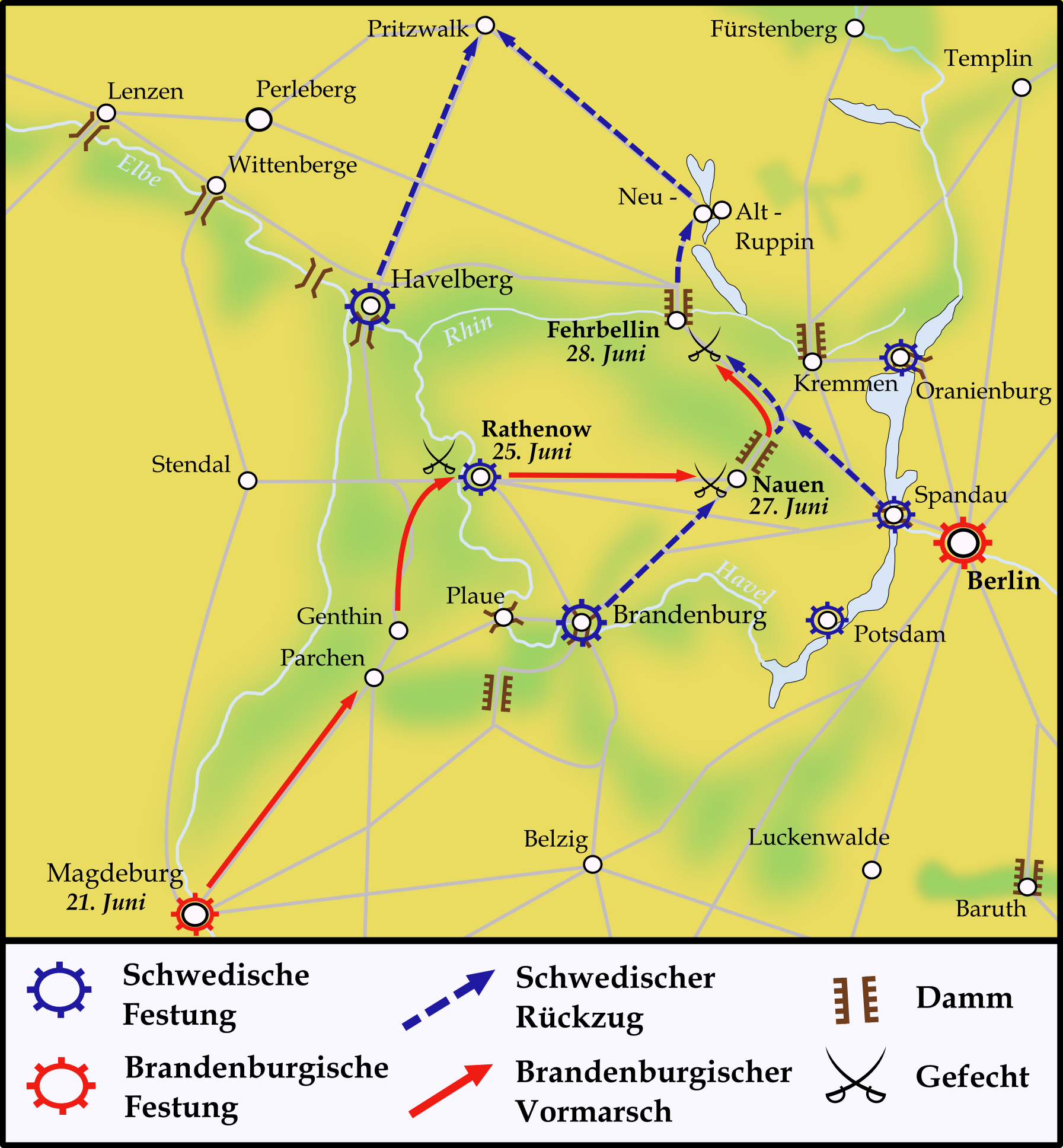
Map of the campaign by Elector Frederick William (23 – 29 June)

On 21 June the Brandenburg army reached Magdeburg. As a result of inadequate reconnaissance the arrival of Brandenburg appeared not to have been noticed by the Swedes, and so Frederick William adopted security measures to protect this tactical advantage. Not until he reached Magdeburg did he receive accurate information about the local situation. From intercepted letters, it appeared that Swedish and Hanoverian troops were about to join forces and attack the fortress of Magdeburg. After holding a military council, the Elector decided to break through the line of the Havel that the Swedes had now reached at their weakest point, at Rathenow. His intent was to separate the two parts of the Swedish army at Havelberg and the city of Brandenburg from one another.

On the morning of 23 June, around 3 a.m., the army set out from Magdeburg. Since the success of the plan depended on the element of surprise, the Elector advanced only with his cavalry, which consisted of 5,000 troopers in 30 squadrons and 600 dragoons. In addition there were 1,350 musketeers who were transported on wagons to ensure their mobility. The artillery comprised 14 guns of various calibres. This army was led by the Elector and the already 69-year-old Field Marshal Georg von Derfflinger. The cavalry was under the command of General of Cavalry Frederick, Landgrave of Hesse-Homburg, Lieutenant General of Görztke and Major General Lüdeke. The infantry was commanded by two major-generals, von Götze and von Pöllnitz.

On 25 June 1675 the Brandenburg army reached Rathenow. Under the personal guidance of Brandenburg's Field Marshal Georg von Derfflinger, they succeeded in defeating the Swedish garrison consisting of six companies of dragoons in bloody street fighting.

That same day the Swedish main army marched from Brandenburg an der Havel to Havelberg, where the crossing of the Elbe was to take place. But the overall strategic situation had changed dramatically because of the recapture of this important position. The ensuing separation of the two Swedish armies, who were caught entirely by surprise, meant that a crossing of the Elbe at Havelber was no longer possible. Field Marshal Carl Gustav Wrangel, who was in Havelberg at an undefended location and without supplies, now gave the main Swedish army under Wolmar Wrangel the command to join him via Fehrbellin. So in order to unite his troops with the main army Field Marshal Carl Gustav Wrangel left for Neustadt on 16/26 June.

The Swedish headquarters appears to have been completely unaware of the actual location and the strength of the Brandenburg army. Lieutenant General Wolmar Wrangel now retired rapidly north to secure his lines of communication and, as ordered, to unite with the now separated Swedish advance guard. The location of Sweden at the fall of Rathenow on 25 June/5 July was Pritzerbe. From here there were only 2 exit routes because of the peculiar natural features in the March of Brandenburg at that time. The shorter passage was, however, threatened by the Brandenburg troops and the road conditions were considered to be extremely difficult. So the Swedes decided to use the route via Nauen, where they could branch out from a) Fehrbellin to Neuruppin, b) Kremmen to Gransee and c) Oranienburg to Prenzlau.

However, since both Oranienburg and Kremmen appeared to the Swedes to be occupied by the enemy, the only option open to them was to retreat via Nauen to Fehrbellin. Early on, the Swedish general sent an advance party of 160 cavalry to secure the passage of Fehrbellin.

The Elector immediately divided his force into three to block the only three passes. The first division under Lieutenant Colonel Hennig was dispatched to Fehrbellin, the second under Adjutant General Kunowski was sent to Kremmen, the third under the command of Captain (Rittmeister) Zabelitz was deployed to Oranienburg. They had the task, with the help of expert local hunters, of getting to the exits to the Havelland Luch swamps ahead of the Swedes, using little known routes through rough terrain. There, the bridges were to be destroyed and the roads made impassable. For this purpose, these exits were to be defended by an armed militia group and by hunters.

Details are only available for the first troop of Lieutenant Colonel Hennig's division. This sub-unit of 100 cuirassiers and 20 dragoons, guided by an experienced local forester, rode through the Rhinfurt at Landin and thence to Fehrbellin. Once there, taking advantage of the element of surprise, they attacked the contingent of 160 Swedish cuirassiers manning the fieldworks guarding the causeway. In this battle, about 50 Swedes were killed A captain, a lieutenant and eight soldiers were captured, the rest escaping with their commander, Lieutenant Colonel Tropp, leaving their horses behind. Brandenburg lost 10 troopers. The Brandenburg soldiers then set fire to the two Rhin bridges on the causeway. Then the causeway itself was also breached in order to cut off the Swedes' avenue of retreat to the north.

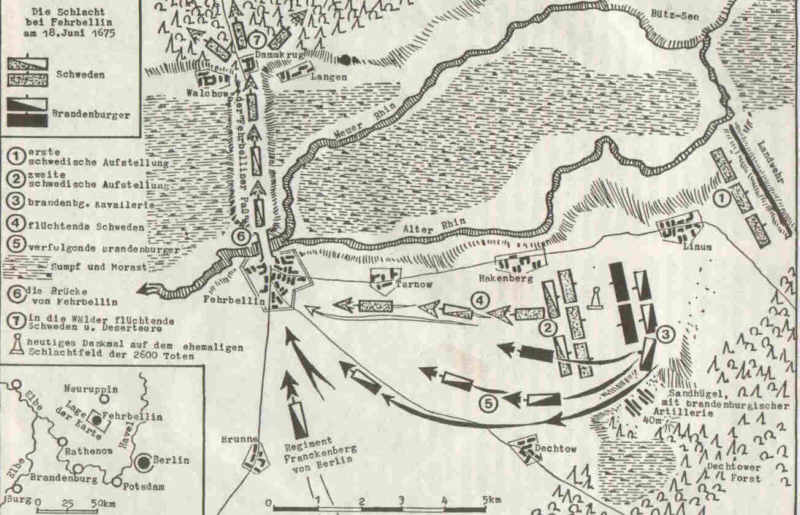
Schematic illustration of the Battle of Fehrbellin on 28 June 1675 – showing the terrain features

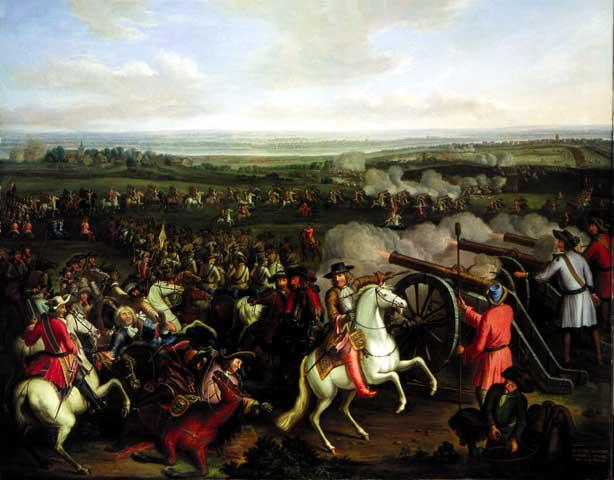
Illustration of the heights occupied by Brandenburg artillery. In the middle of the painting is Elector Frederick William on a stallion. Painting by Dismar Degen, 1740

Since no order was issued to hold the pass at all costs because of its importance for the possible withdrawal of Swedish troops, the Brandenburg division attempted to rejoin the main army. On the afternoon of 17/27 June (after the actual battle at Nauen) they arrived back with the main body. The reports by this and the two other divisions reinforced the Elector's view to fight a decisive battle against the Swedes.

On 27 June the first battle between the Swedish rearguard and Brandenburg vanguard took place: the Battle of Nauen, which ended with the recapture of the town. By evening, the two main armies were drawn up opposite one another in battle formation. However, the Swedish position appeared too strong for a successful attack by Brandenburg and the Brandenburg troops were exhausted by having to undertake forced marches in the days beforehand. So the Elector's orders were to withdraw into or behind the town of Nauen and make camp there. On the Brandenburg side the expectation was that they would begin engaging the next morning at the gates of Nauen in the decisive battle. The Swedes, however, took advantage of the cover of night to retreat towards Fehrbellin. From the beginning of their withdrawal on 25 June until after the battle at Nauen on 27 June, the Swedes lost a total of about 600 men during their retreat and another 600 were taken prisoner.

As the causeway and the bridge over the Rhin had been destroyed the day before by the Brandenburg raid, Sweden was forced to participate in the what would be the Battle of Fehrbellin. Lieutenant General Wolmar Wrangel had at most 7,000 men and seven cannon at his disposal, the rest was with his stepbrother near Kyritz.

The Swedes were defeated, but succeeded under cover of night to cross the repaired bridge. Their losses amounted to 600 killed and wounded in the battle, compared to Brandenburg's 500. The Swedes destroyed the bridge behind them, preventing Frederick's army from effectively pursuing. The retreat continued through the Prignitz and Mecklenburg. The Brandenburg cavalry caught up with the Swedish rearguard at Haberhof, but was repulsed. Another attempt was made near Wittstock, where the Brandenburg cavalry was once again thrown back with the loss of their major-general von Götze. After this, they called off the pursuit. Many Swedish soldiers deserted during the hasty retreat.

== Aftermath ==
On 7 July, after having saved itself into Swedish territory, the army counted only 7,000 men, down from 11,000–12,000 at the start of the spring offensive. The rest were either killed, captured, wounded, sick, had deserted, or straggled behind. By the end of July, it counted 7,746 men; it is unknown if this includes fresh recruits, stragglers returning, or the recovery of wounded and sick, or all three. In total, the Swedes had lost around 4,000 men since June. Of these, about 1,100–1,500 were inflicted in combat. (Note: Summary of Swedish losses sustained at Rathenow (near 500), 1st Fehrbellin (12–50), Nauen (light), and 2nd Fehrbellin (600).)

The total Brandenburg losses are unknown, but fewer than the Swedes. They had between 600 and 1,000 combat losses. (Note: Summary of Brandenburger losses sustained at Rathenow (50–100), 1st Fehrbellin (light), Nauen (60), and 2nd Fehrbellin (500).)

The Swedish military defeat at Fehrbellin brought not only diplomatic consequences, but also shattered their hitherto perceived aura of invincibility. The remnants of the army found themselves back on Swedish territory in Pomerania, from where they had started the war.

Sweden's overall strategic situation deteriorated further when, during the summer months, Denmark and the Holy Roman Empire declared war on Sweden. Their possessions in North Germany (the bishoprics of Bremen and Verden) were suddenly under threat. In the years that followed, Sweden, now forced onto the back foot, had to concentrate on defending its territories in northern Europe against numerous attacks, succeeding in the end only in holding onto Scania.

France's strategic plan, by contrast, had proved successful: Brandenburg-Prussia was still officially at war with France, but its army had pulled back from the Rhine front and had to concentrate all its further efforts in the war against Sweden.

== Literature ==
- Anonym: Theatrum Europaeum. Vol. 11: 1672–1679. Merian, Frankfurt am Main, 1682.
- Frank Bauer: Fehrbellin 1675. Brandenburg-Preußens Aufbruch zur Großmacht. Vowinckel, Berg am Starnberger See and Potsdam, 1998, ISBN 3-921655-86-2.
- Samuel Buchholz: Versuch einer Geschichte der Churmark Brandenburg von der ersten Erscheinung der deutschen Sennonen an bis auf jetzige Zeiten. Vol. 4. Birnstiel, Berlin, 1771.
- Friedrich Ferdinand Carlson: Geschichte Schwedens. Vol. 4: Bis zum Reichstage 1680. Perthes, Gotha, 1855.
- Friedrich Förster: Friedrich Wilhelm, der grosse Kurfürst, und seine Zeit. Eine Geschichte des Preussischen Staates während der Dauer seiner Regierung; in biographischen. In: Preußens Helden in Krieg und Frieden. Vol. 1.1 Hempel, Berlin, 1855.
- Curt Jany: Geschichte der Preußischen Armee. Vom 15. Jahrhundert–1914. Vol. 1: Von den Anfängen bis 1740. 2nd expanded edition. Biblio Verlag, Osnabrück, 1967, ISBN 3-7648-1471-3.
- Paul Douglas Lockhart: Sweden in the Seventeenth Century. Palgrave Macmillan, Basingstoke etc., 2004, ISBN 0-333-73156-5, (English)
- Maren Lorenz: Das Rad der Gewalt. Militär und Zivilbevölkerung in Norddeutschland nach dem Dreißigjährigen Krieg (1650–1700). Böhlau, Cologne, 2007, ISBN 3-412-11606-8.
- Martin Philippson: Der große Kurfürst Friedrich Wilhelm von Brandenburg. Part III [1660 to 1688] In: Elibron Classics, Adamant Media Corporation, Boston, MA, 2005 ISBN 978-0-543-67566-8, (German, reprint of the first edition of 1903 by Siegfried Cronbach in Berlin).
- Michael Rohrschneider: Johann Georg II. von Anhalt-Dessau (1627–1693). Eine politische Biographie. Duncker & Humblot, Berlin, 1998, ISBN 3-428-09497-2.
- Ralph Tuchtenhagen: Kleine Geschichte Schwedens. 1. Auflage, In: Beck’sche Reihe, Vol. 1787, Beck, Munich, 2008, ISBN 978-3-406-53618-2.
- Matthias Nistahl: Die Reichsexekution gegen Schweden in Bremen Verden, in Heinz-Joachim Schulze, Landschaft und regionale Identität, Stade, 1989
- Wimarson, Nils (1897). Sveriges Krig i Tyskland 1675–1679. Vol. 1. Lund: Gleerupska Universitetsbokhandeln.
- Mankell, Julius (1865). Uppgifter rörande Svenska Krigsmagtens styrka, sammansättning och fördelning. Stockholm: C. M. Thimgren. OCLC 919518290.
