= Prussian War =

Prussian War may refer to:

- Polish–Teutonic War (1519–21)

== See also ==
- Wars and battles involving Prussia
