= Pierre Taillant =

French army officer (1816–1883)

Pierre André Taillant
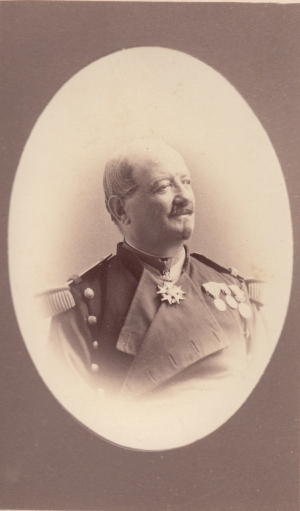
- Born: August 17, 1816; Pont-Saint-Esprit, Gard, Kingdom of France
- Died: May 14, 1883 (aged 66); Pont-Saint-Esprit, Gard, French Republic
- Military career
- Branch: July Monarchy; French Second Republic; Second French Empire; French Third Republic
- Service years: 1834–1878
- Rank: Lieutenant Colonel
- Conflicts: French conquest of Algeria; First Italian War of Independence; Crimean War: Siege of Sevastopol Franco-Prussian War; Siege of Phalsbourg
- Awards: Medal of the siege of Rome; Medal of Military Valor; Crimea Medal; Legion of Honour

Pierre André Taillant (August 17, 1816 – May 14, 1883) was a French officer known for the heroic defense of Phalsbourg during the Franco-Prussian War at the Siege of Phalsbourg.

== Biography ==
Pierre André Taillant was born in 1816: his mother's name was Marie Masse and his father, François Joseph, worked as a tool maker. After a short education, he entered the service as a voluntary commitment to the 13th Infantry Regiment on August 31, 1834. He served in Algeria from 1834 to 1836 then served as a sergeant in January 1837 and adjutant in 1841.

On March 28, 1841, he was appointed sub-lieutenant in the 13th, then lieutenant in 1847. He then served in the First Italian War of Independence. For his service, he was appointed captain in 1852 and participated in the Crimean War at the Siege of Sevastopol in 1855.

In 1854 he had passed as captain in 1st regiment of the Grenadier Guards . He served in this corps until his promotion to the rank of battalion commander in 1861. The August 8, 1867, he joined the headquarters corps and served at Mont-Dauphin for a year.

In November 1868, he was appointed commander of the Place de Phalsbourg. He would organize the defense of the city and support a siege of the city between August 10, 1870, and December 12, 1870.

After 4 months of resistance, the last ration is consumed, the population is decimated and half of the remaining garrison is in hospital. Taillant had the cannons nailed down, destroyed the last ammunition and wrote to Major von Giese, commander of the investment troops:

Mr. Major, The too great remoteness of the French army and the famine which tortures the inhabitants, the wounded and the prisoners of war, but which could not tame us if we were alone here, do not allow us to continue the fight, because it is our duty to be human above all. It is to obey the laws of humanity that I had to not give in to the wishes of my comrades in arms, who asked to bury themselves with their leader under the ruins of the fortress that they defend so well. for four months. The gates of Phalsbourg are open. You will find us disarmed, but not defeated.'

Taillant left Phalsbourg when there was no longer a single French soldier. On December 15, 1870, he was sent to Germany and interned in Koblenz from December 12, 1871, to April 21, 1871. He refused to undertake not to serve against Germany; he did not return until after the Treaty of Versailles.

A year later, the Council of Inquiry into the Capitulations of Strongholds, chaired by Marshal Baraguey-d'Hilliers, appointed him lieutenant-colonel and conferred on him the rank of Commander of the Legion of Honour with the approval of Adolphe Thiers.

He was appointed commander of the Place de Maubeuge on May 11, 1872. He passed in 1877 to the command of Saint-Denis, where his retirement was granted to him on December 10, 1878.

He died in his hometown on May 14, 1883.

== Bibliography ==
- « Taillant (Pierre) », dans Larousse, Grand dictionnaire universel du XX^{e} siècle, 6 vol.
- René Fabrègue. "Connaissez-vous Pierre Taillant ?". www.saintjuliendepeyrolas.com. Archived from the original on September 24, 2015..

== External Images ==
Pierre Taillant
