= Hugo von Obernitz =

German soldier (1819–1901)

Freiherr Hugo von Obernitz
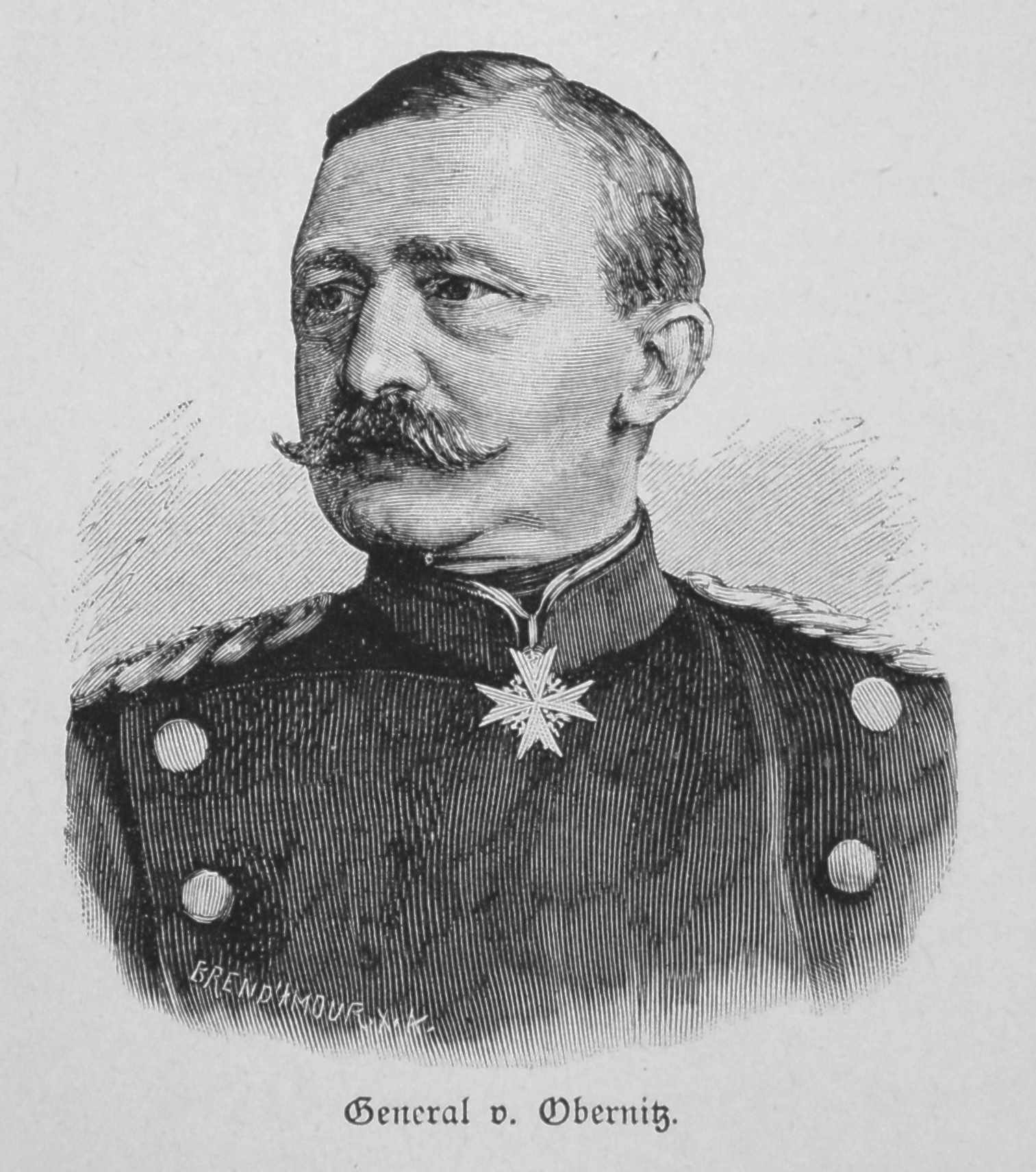
- Born: 16 April 1819; Bischofswerder, West Prussia, Prussia
- Died: 18 September 1901 (aged 83); Bad Honnef, Rhine Province, German Empire
- Burial place: Alter Friedhof cemetery
- Military career
- Allegiance: Prussia; North German Confederation; German Empire
- Branch: Prussian Army
- Service years: 1836–1888
- Rank: General of the Infantry
- Commands: XIV Corps
- Conflicts: Austro-Prussian War: Battle of Königgrätz; Franco-Prussian War: Battle of Wörth; Lichtenberg Siege; Siege of Paris
- Awards: Order of the Black Eagle; Pour le Merite; Friedrich Order; Order of St. George

Hugo Moritz Anton Heinrich Freiherr von Obernitz (born 16 April 1819; died 18 September 1901 in Honnef) was a Prussian general who served as adjutant general of Kaiser Wilhelm I.

== Biography ==
Hugo was the son of the Prussian Major Friedrich Karl Moritz von Obernitz and his wife Wilhelmine.

After attending cadet schools in Kulm and Berlin, Obernitz entered the 4th Infantry Regiment on 18 August 1836 as a second lieutenant. In 1852 he became captain and in 1856 he was promoted to major. In June 1861 he was promoted to lieutenant colonel and from the spring of 1863 he was commander of the Guards Fusilier Regiment. On 6 June 1865 he was appointed a member of the study commission of the war academy in Berlin. During the Austro-Prussian War, he led the 1st Guards Infantry Brigade as part of the 2nd Army in the battles of Soor and Königinhof against the Austrians. In the decisive Battle of Königgrätz on 3 July, his troops captured 40 cannons and the town of Chlum. For this, Obernitz was awarded the Pour le Mérite in September 1866 and was promoted to major general. From 1868 to 1871 he was an inspector of hunters and marksmen.

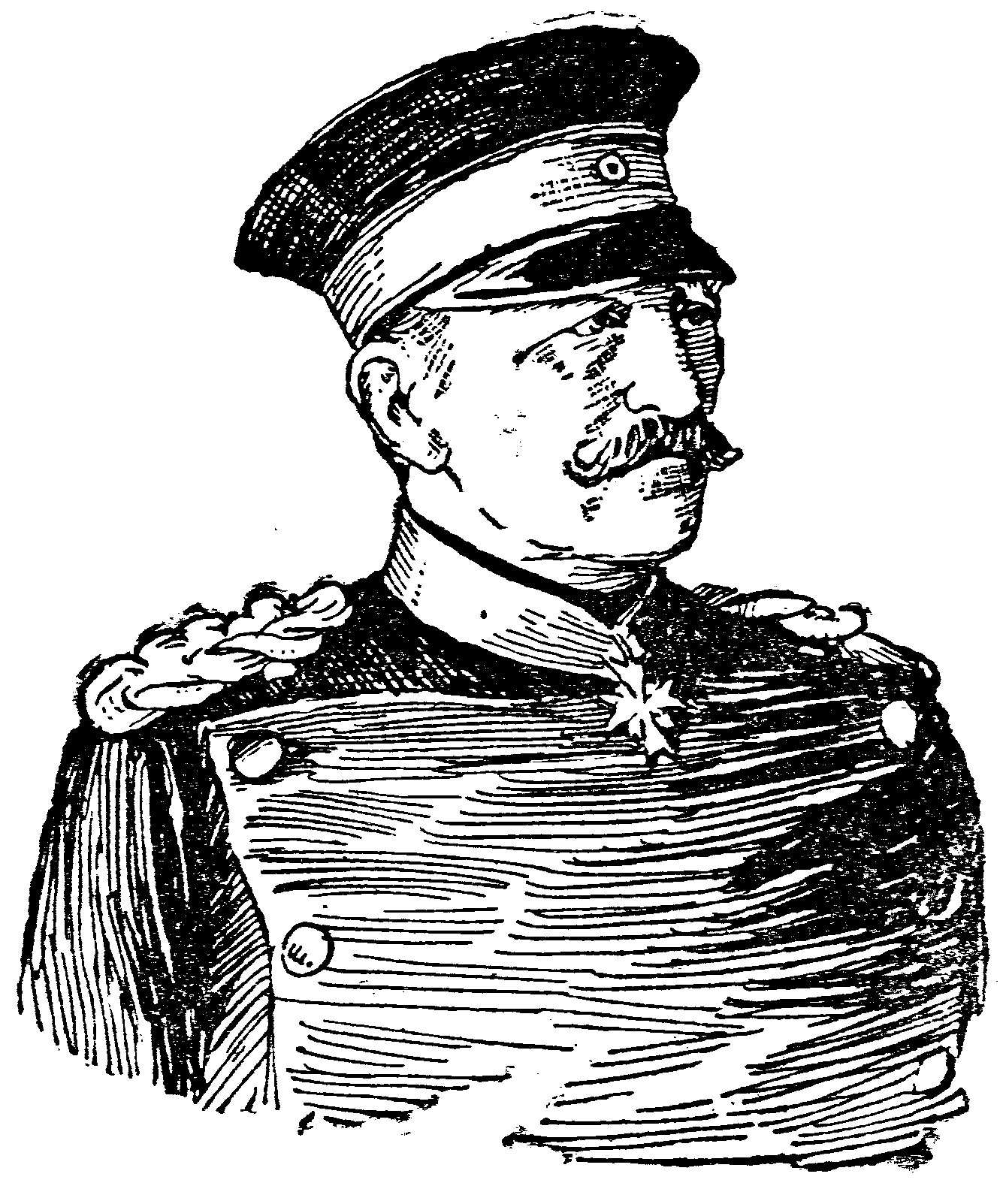

On 29 September 1866 Obernitz was promoted to major general. From 1868 to 1871 he was a military inspector.

He was commander of the Württemberg Field Division in the Franco-Prussian War, fighting in the Battle of Wörth and, as part of the II Corps under the command of General Eduard von Fransecky, participated in the Siege of Paris. Obernitz received a grant of 100,000 Thalers for these services. On 22 October 1871 he became commander of the 14th Division in Düsseldorf. On 11 June 1879 he was appointed commander of the XIV Corps in Karlsruhe. Meanwhile, in June 1879 he was promoted to General of the Infantry, and on 22 March 1884 he was appointed chief of the 4th (3rd East Prussian) Grenadier Regiment "King Frederick the Great". On 18 August 1886 he celebrated his fiftieth anniversary of service.

After his retirement in 1888, he and his wife Anna Friederike Ida Bertha, née von Usedom, bought a villa in Bad Honnef. They had several children, among them:

- Friedrich Wilhelm Viktor Moritz Ferdinand (1860–1909) - Prussian statesman;
- Arthur Rudolf Eduard (born 1873) - Prussian military major.

Hugo von Obernitz died on 18 September 1901 in Bad Honnef, and was buried in the Alter Friedhof cemetery. Later, his wife was buried next to him. In the cemetery you can still see the tombstone of Hugo von Obernitz, whose bronze Prussian eagle was stolen in 1988.

== Honours and awards ==
- Kingdom of Prussia:
  - Knight of the Prussian Crown, 3rd Class, 14 January 1865
  - Pour le Mérite (military), 20 September 1866
  - Service Award Cross
  - Iron Cross (1870), 1st Class with 2nd Class on Black Band
  - Knight of the Red Eagle, 2nd Class with Star, Oak Leaves and Swords, 1871; 1st Class with Swords on Ring, 18 January 1874; Grand Cross, 22 March 1880
  - Grand Commander's Cross of the Royal House Order of Hohenzollern, 8 September 1877
  - Knight of the Black Eagle, 16 September 1885; with Collar
- Austrian Empire:
  - Knight of the Iron Crown, 2nd Class, 1862
  - Commander of the Imperial Order of Leopold, 1864
- Baden:
  - Grand Cross of the Zähringer Lion, 1880
  - Knight of the House Order of Fidelity, 1886
- Lippe:
  - Cross of Honour of the House Order of Lippe, 1st Class with Swords
  - Military Merit Medal (Schaumburg-Lippe)
- Mecklenburg:
  - Grand Cross of the Wendish Crown, with Golden Crown
  - Military Merit Cross, 1st Class (Schwerin)
- Russian Empire:
  - Knight of St. George, 4th Class, February 1871
  - Knight of the White Eagle
- Kingdom of Saxony:
  - Grand Cross of the Albert Order, 1868
  - Commander of the Military Order of St. Henry, 2nd Class, 1871
- Beylik of Tunis: Grand Officer of the Order of Glory
- Württemberg:
  - Grand Cross of the Friedrich Order, 1868
  - Grand Cross of the Military Merit Order, 28 December 1870

== Sources ==
- Hugo von Obernitz, General, Kommandeur der Württ.
- Kurt von Priesdorff: Soldatisches Führertum, Band 8, Hanseatische Verlagsanstalt Hamburg, S. 69–73.
- "The siege operations in the campaign against France, 1870-71."
- Stuttgarter Ehrenbürger von 1850 bis 1900
