= Siege of Lichtenberg =

- Part of Franco-Prussian War
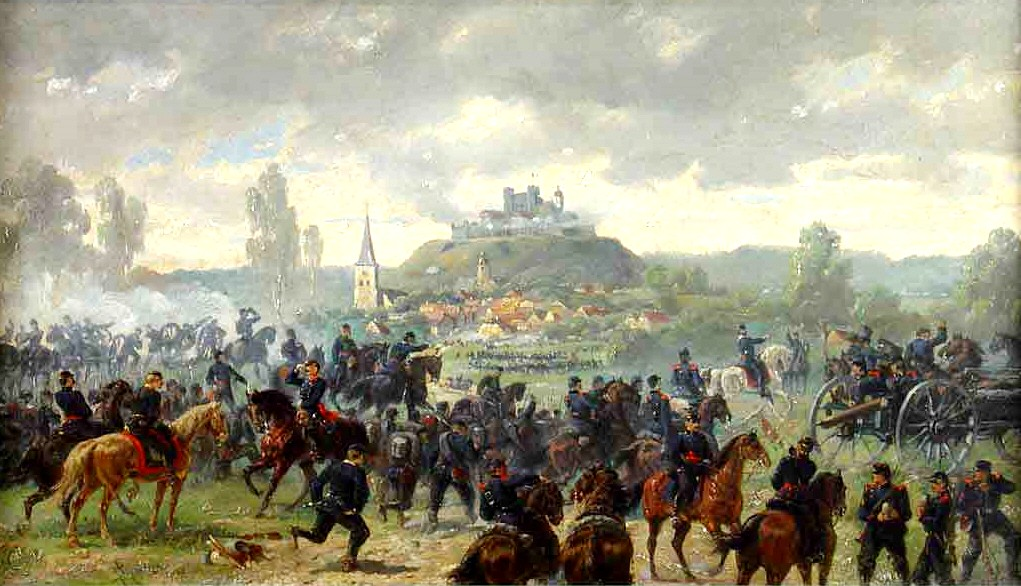
- „Die Berennung von Lichtenberg“, oil on canvas by Karl Albert von Schott
Date	August 9–10, 1870
Location	Lichtenberg Castle, Alsace, France
Result	German Victory

Belligerents
French Empire	North German Confederation: Prussia; Württemberg

Commanders and leaders
Second Lieutenant Archer	Hugo von Obernitz; Hermann von Hügel

Strength
30 officers and 280 soldiers	2 Jäger battalions 2 infantry companies 3 artillery batteries 1/2 cavalry squadron pioneer detachment

Casualties and losses
10 men killed and 27 wounded, the rest were captured, 4 cannons, 3 howitzers, 204 Chassepot rifles, many shells and muskets as well as many reserves seized	2 officers and 36 soldiers killed or wounded (of whom 12 were killed and 24 wounded)

The siege of Lichtenberg was a battle of the Franco-Prussian War that took place on August 9 to 10 in 1870 at Lichtenberg Castle between the French and the German (Prussian and Württembergian) troops. After a brief but fierce shelling a German force under the command of Generalmajor Hermann Freiherr von Hügel, part of the Württemberg Division (Generalleutnant Hugo von Obernitz) and the Third Army (Crown Prince Frederick William) forced the surrender of the French garrison of Lichtenberg under the command of Second Lieutenant Archer (of the 96th Infantry Regiment). In addition to Lichtenberg, in a single period in August 1870, the German army also defeated the French fortresses of La Petite-Pierre, Marsal and Vitry-le-François.

== Battle ==
The fortified Lichtenberg Castle is located at the entrance to the Vosges mountains on a conical hill. On the night of August 8, the order to capture Lichtenberg reached Prussian Generalleutnant von Obernitz. To carry out the order, General von Obernitz formed an attack column and appointed General von Hügel was as its commander. The initial force consisted of the 1st and 3rd Jäger battalions, half a squadron of the 4th Cavalry Regiment, two 4-pdr. batteries and a detachment of pioneers. From their open-air barracks near Rothbach and Ingweiler, the Württemberg Army troops arrived at Lichtenberg on the morning of 9 August and captured the village of Lichtenberg. Nevertheless, the fortress garrison rejected the German demand of surrender and the latter's infantry and cavalry forces accordingly established positions in the town.

The two German artillery batteries opened fire with the support of infantry muskets, and French artillery responded forcefully but with little success. Unplanned reinforcements in the form of two companies of the 2nd Infantry Regiment got close to the barricades without being detected by the French. Although the French fire points were muted, the situation showed that the German batteries could hardly penetrate this fortress. Therefore, General von Obernitz sent another battery of Anton von Marchtaler's battalion to fight. Although this 6-pdr. battery caused a fire in the enemy fortifications the French garrison still refused to surrender. Von Obernitz had to order a halt to the shelling. The German siege column had begun to leave Lichtenberg and march to rejoin the Württemberg Division while one battalion was left to observe the fortress. However the battalion commander, Oberstleutnant Rudolf Steiger, soon was mortally wounded. Likewise, the defenders opened fire on the two infantry companies when the latter tried to join the retreat. Suddenly, the roof of one of the main structures of the French garrison caught on fire and the siege was renewed with Major von Marchtaler being ordered to turn back to conduct artillery fire.

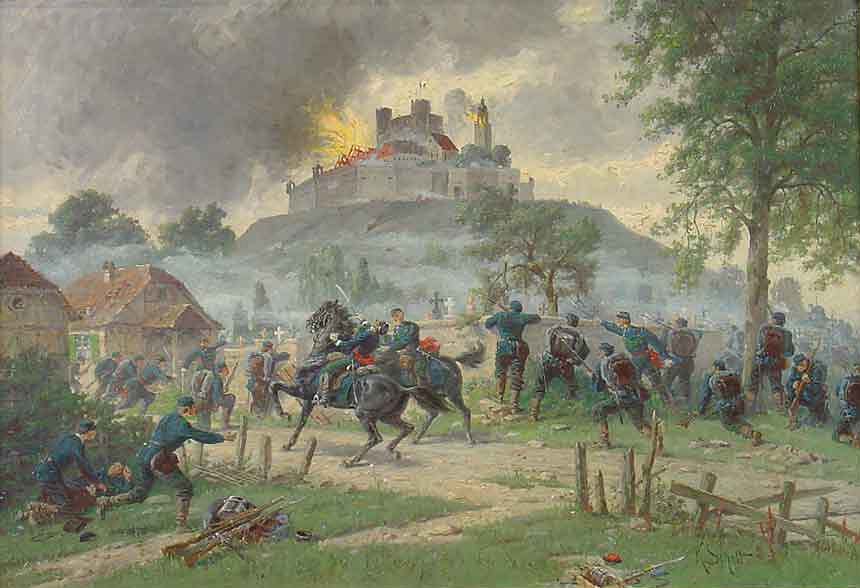
"The death of Colonel Staiger in Lichtenberg" by Karl Albert von Schott

Major von Marchtaler's batteries accordingly resumed shelling the fortress, and by the night of August 9, the damages to the fortifications became more apparent. The French garrison eventually raised a white flag, and surrender to the German Württemberg Division. The next day (August 10) Captain Seesdorf – von Steiger's successor - and his battalion occupied the fortress.

The success of the Germans in the siege of the medieval castle of Lichtenberg brought them hundreds of prisoners (including 30 officers) along with a lot of artillery, Chassepot rifles, and reserves from the enemy.
