= Neuhofen an der Krems =

- Municipality
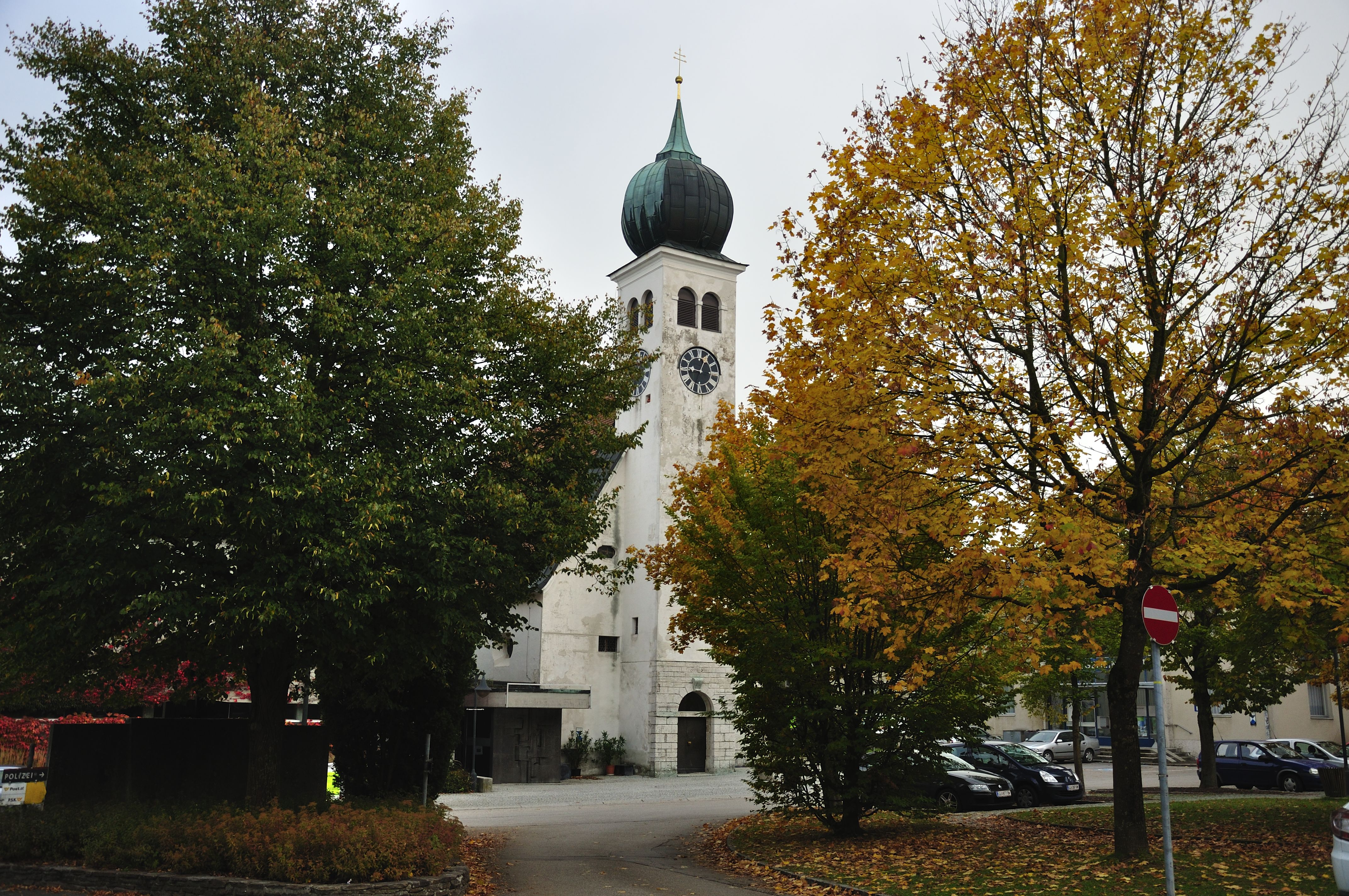
- Church of Saint Matthew

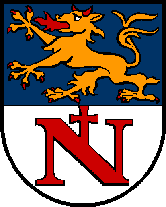
- Coat of arms

- Location within Austria
- Coordinates: 48°8′1″N 14°14′0″E
- Country: Austria
- State: Upper Austria
- District: Linz-Land

Government
  - Mayor: Petra Baumgartner (ÖVP)

Area
  - Total: 18.01 km^{2} (6.95 sq mi)
- Elevation: 303 m (994 ft)

Population (2018-01-01)
  - Total: 6,269
  - Density: 348.1/km^{2} (901.5/sq mi)
- Time zone: UTC+1 (CET)
  - Summer (DST): UTC+2 (CEST)
- Postal code: 4501
- Area code: 07227
- Vehicle registration: LL
- Website: www.neuhofen-krems.at

Neuhofen an der Krems is a municipality in the district Linz-Land in the Austrian state of Upper Austria.

== Geography ==
Neuhofen lies in the middle of the triangle formed by the cities of Linz, Wels, and Steyr. About 10 percent of the municipality is forest, and 75 percent is farmland.

== Personalities ==
It is the birthplace of Georg von Derfflinger.
