= Georg von Derfflinger =

Brandenburg–Prussian general (1606–1695)

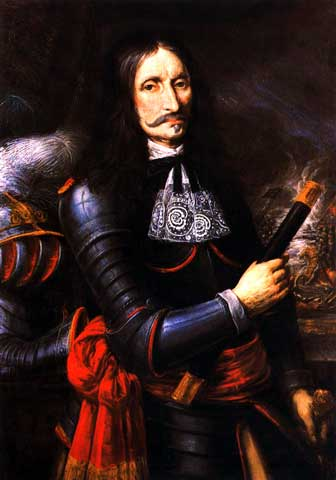
- Born: 20 March 1606; Neuhofen an der Krems, Archduchy of Austria, Holy Roman Empire
- Died: 14 February 1695 (aged 88); Gusow, Margraviate of Brandenburg, Holy Roman Empire
- Military career
- Allegiance: Saxony (until 1632); Sweden (until 1648); Brandenburg-Prussia (from 1654)
- Service years: c. 1625–1690
- Conflicts: Thirty Years' War; Scanian War

Georg von Derfflinger (20 March 1606 – 14 February 1695) was a field marshal in the army of Brandenburg-Prussia during and after the Thirty Years' War (1618–1648).

== Early years ==
Born 1606 at Neuhofen an der Krems in Austria, into a family of rich Protestant peasants, Derfflinger had to leave his home due to religious persecution under the Catholic Habsburg dynasty in the course of the Counter-Reformation. He probably fought side-by-side with insurgent Bohemian nobles led by Jindřich Matyáš Thurn and served in the armed forces of various Protestant combatant powers, at first in the Saxon army, but most of the time in that of Sweden. Until the 1648 Peace of Westphalia he distinguished himself as an able and daring cavalry leader and gained a reputation for brilliance and bravery, which in 1654 persuaded Elector Frederick William of Brandenburg to offer Derfflinger a senior position in his army.

== Personality ==
Derfflinger was supposedly a notorious drunkard who constantly drank schnapps, but his fondness for alcohol did not impede his military abilities. His marriage in 1646 to an heiress of the Brandenburg nobility had already secured him a number of possessions, which he was able to augment with estates granted to him for his military exploits. A lifelong soldier, Derfflinger had no formal education, but was entrusted by the Elector with numerous important military tasks and played a central role in the reform of the Brandenburgian cavalry and artillery. He had a very stormy relationship with Frederick William and argued with him incessantly, at one point quitting. In order to gain back the Elector's employ, he wrote down a list of incredible demands, which included a clause stipulating that no man charge into battle ahead of him and that he take a certain percentage of plunder and captured officers from every engagement.

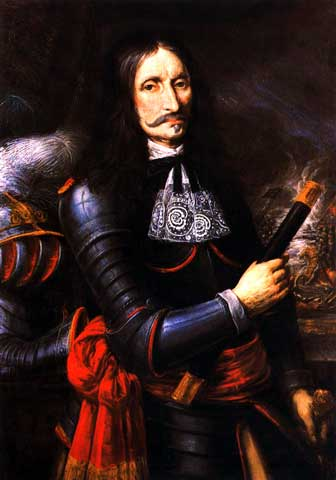
Georg von Derfflinger about 1670

== Brandenburg service ==
In 1674, Derfflinger was elevated to a Reichsfreiherr by Emperor Leopold I. A year later, he was decisive in defeating the Swedes and driving them out of Brandenburg. He impersonated a Swedish officer (a feat he was able to do because he had served in the armies of Sweden), and was able to convince the Swedes to open the gates of Rathenow, allowing him and 1,000 nearby dragoons to storm the fortress. He was also a commander in the Battle of Fehrbellin, where he won a decisive victory over the Swedes under Charles XI, who were occupying Brandenburg, pillaging the countryside, and abusing the locals. His last military campaign was in 1690 against King Louis XIV of France, when he was 84 years old. Derfflinger died at his estates in Gusow.

== Legacy ==
The Imperial German Navy's battlecruiser SMS Derfflinger was named after him.

== Bibliography ==
- Gerd-Ulrich Herrmann, Freiherr von Derfflinger, Stapp-Verlag 1997, ISBN 3-87776-178-X.
- Citino, Robert M. The German Way of War: From the Thirty Years War to the Third Reich. University Press of Kansas. Lawrence, KS, 2005. ISBN 0-7006-1410-9
