= Siege of Wolgast =

1675 siege in Germany

- Part of Scanian War
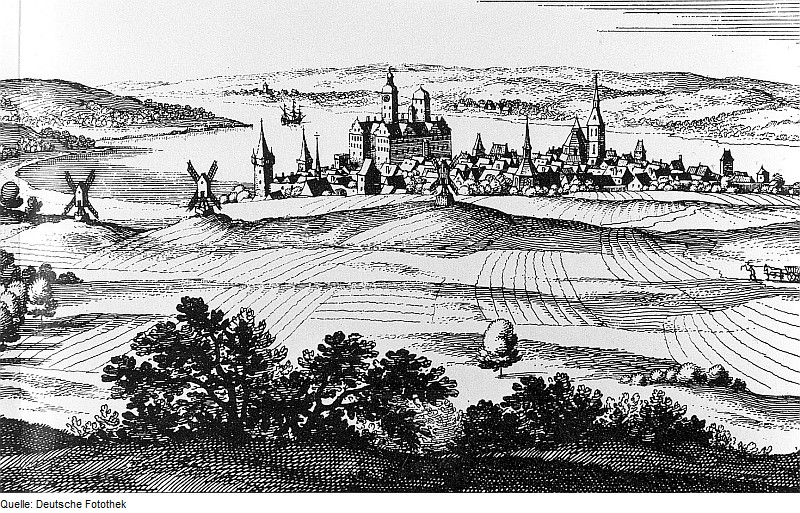
- Wolgast c. 1652, from the Deutsche Fotothek
Date	1–10 November 1675
Location	Wolgast, Germany 54°03′N 13°46′E
Result	Brandenburgian victory

Belligerents
Brandenburg	(yes) Swedish Empire

Commanders and leaders
(Margraviate of Brandenburg) Frederick William	(Swedish Empire) Andreas Dubislaff von Blixen (surrendered)

Units involved
Unknown	(Swedish Empire) Wolgast garrison

Strength
Unknown	c. 820

Casualties and losses
Unknown	Unknown

The Siege of Wolgast (Note: German: Belagerung von Wolgast, Swedish: Belägringen av Wolgast) took place from 1 to 10 November 1675 during the Swedish invasion of Brandenburg, part of the Scanian War. Frederick William besieged Wolgast, then part of Swedish Pomerania, and forced the Swedish garrison to surrender.

Wolgast was returned to Sweden in accordance with the Treaty of Saint-Germain-en-Laye (1679) that ended the war.

== Background ==
In 1674, Sweden invaded Brandenburg as France's ally. Denmark–Norway, who wanted to regain its territories lost in 1658, supported Brandenburg-Prussia and invaded the Swedish possessions in Germany in 1675. In autumn, the Swedes had already been pushed back to the North German Coast, and the Brandenburgians, under Elector Frederick William, subsequently besieged Wolgast, one of the Swedish Empire's last holdings within the Holy Roman Empire. Wolgast was of great importance for both parties because of its location within the mouth of the Peene.

== Siege ==
Frederick William opened the siege of Wolgast on 1 November. Establishing positions for his guns was delayed by fire from the garrison and ships in the harbour, but once in place on 9 November, they quickly destroyed two of the castle's bastions along with the powder store and half the castle, while the Brandenburg troops began to prepare an assault. Recognising his position was hopeless, the Swedish commander, Andreas Dubislaff von Blixen, negotiated terms allowing the garrison free passage to the Swedish garrison in Stralsund.

== Aftermath ==
According to Jensen, any German-born Swedish soldiers were forcibly enlisted by Frederick William, while Wimarson asserts that, despite Imperial letters prohibiting Germans to fight for Sweden, the Wolgast-accord allowed for an exception; they could, however, join the Bandenburg-Prussian Army if they so wished. After this conquest, Frederick William turned his attention to Anklam, which he sought to seize in order to better approach Stettin.

== Sources ==
- Jensen, N.P (1900). Den Skaanske Krig [The Scanian War] (PDF) (in Danish). DET NORDISKE FORLAG.
- Müsebeck, Ernst Friedrich Christian (1897). Die feldzüge des groszen kurfürsten in Pommern, 1675-1677 ... (in German). Druck von Herrcke & Lebeling in Stettin.
- Wimarson, Nils (1897). Sveriges krig i Tyskland 1675-1679 (in Swedish). Distribuent: Gleerupska universitetsbokhandeln.
- von Essen, Michael Fredholm (2019). Charles XI’s War: The Scanian War Between Sweden and Denmark, 1675-1679. Century of the Soldier. Helion & Company. ISBN 9781911628002.
