= Karl Albert von Schott =

German painter

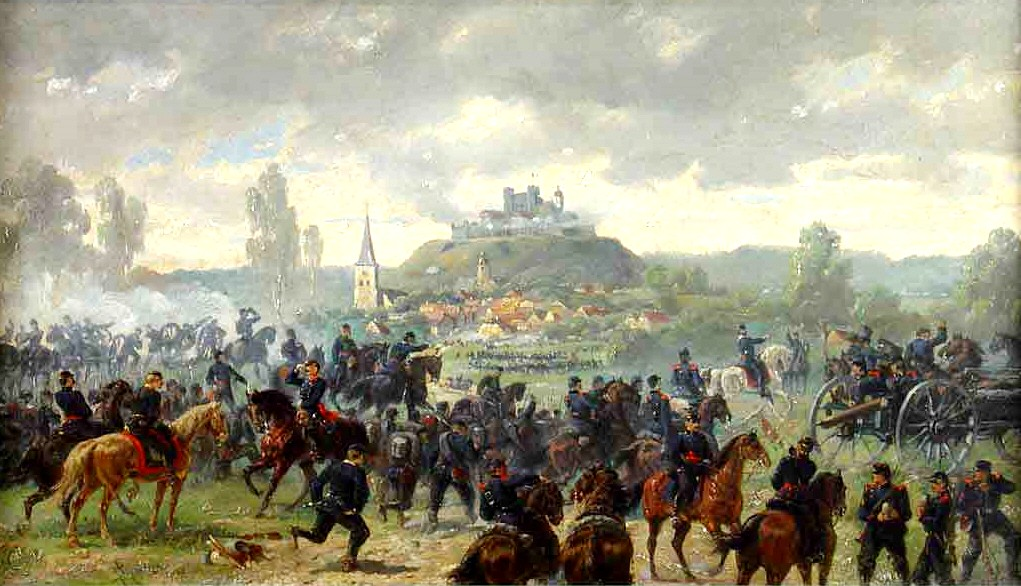
Storming of the Château de Lichtenberg

Karl Albert von Schott (13 May 1840 in Bad Wimpfen – 21 February 1911 in Stuttgart) was a 19th-century Württembergian officer and painter.

Karl Albert von Schott served in rank of lieutenant colonel in the Württemberg army.

After the end of his military service he was in Munich since 1888 a private student of Anton Braith. He was not entered in the register book of the Munich Art Academy.

As a painter he remained loyal to his original profession and painted mostly densely populated battlefield images. He is known primarily for his dramatic paintings of the Franco-Prussian War.
