= Siege of Marsal =

- Part of Franco-Prussian War
Date	August 13 – 14, 1870
Location	Marsal, Moselle, France
Result	German victory

Belligerents
French Empire	North German Confederation: Prussia; Bavaria

Commanders and leaders
Unknown	Jakob von Hartmann; Friedrich von Bothmer

Units involved
Unknown	II Corps

Strength
600 troops and 60 – 70 artillery pieces	Brigade Infantry No. 7, Brigade Trade cavalry and 7 artillery reserves

Casualties and losses
16 officers and several hundred soldiers were captured, 61 artillery pieces, 8,000 rifles and a significant number of supplies were captured	Unknown

The siege of Marsal was a battle of the Franco-Prussian War on August 13 to 14, 1870 between the French Empire and the combined German forces of Prussia and Bavaria in Marsal. Under the command of Lieutenant General Jakob von Hartmann, after replacing the Prussian 4th Cavalry Division, II Corps of the Kingdom of Bavaria forced the surrender of the French Empire's defenses, after a brief resistance by the French troops stationed at the fortress. Marsal fell to the German army in the same period as the French fortresses of Lichtenberg, La Petite-Pierre and Vitry. With the quick victory of the Bavarian army at Marsal, the road from Dieuze to Nancy was open to the Germans. In addition, the siege also brought the Germans many raw materials for the war, as well as hundreds of prisoners (including some officers of the French army).

== The Battle ==
On the day and night of, the 4th Bavarian Division under the command of Lieutenant General Friedrich von Bothmer began his march to La Petite-Pierre. On their way to the heights of the Mecleuves, they were ordered to march through Fort Marsal to Lunéville. Earlier, on 13 August, the Prussian cavalry had reached Marsal, but were unable to force the fortress to surrender and were unable to capture Marsal. Faced with this situation, the forces of the Bavarian II Corps (including reserve artillery forces ) - part of the German Third Army by Prince Friedrich Wilhelm replaced the Prussian cavalry to proceed the blockade on Marsal. On August 14, a German detachment arrived at Marsal. Under the command of Von Bothmer, the Bavarian army opened fire, and agreement was made between the Germans and the French garrison. In the process, a brief German bombardment destroyed a French artillery depot. The German infantry also advanced and took control of a number of fortifications. The German artillery attack influenced the conclusion of the German-French agreement: the French defense at Marsal ended with the defenders of the fortress surrendering to the Germans.

During the campaign of 1870 - 1871, Marsal, along with Lichtenberg, were two French fortresses that fell to the German army after only a shelling. The defenders of Marsal fortress are reported to have fired a single shot when the fortress was besieged by the Bavarians.
