= Siege of Phalsbourg =

- Part of Franco-Prussian War
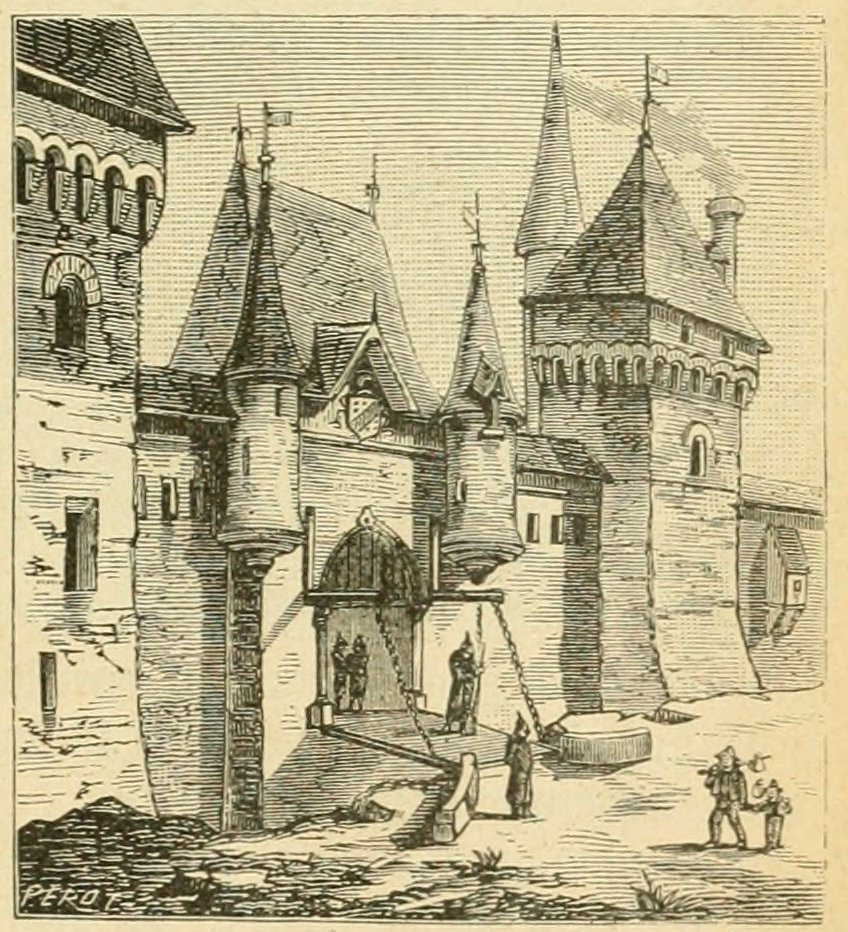
- One of the fortified gates in Phalsbourg
| Date | 10 August 1870 – 12 December 1870 |
| Location | Phalsbourg, Alsace, France |
| Result | German Victory |

Belligerents
| French Empire French Republic | North German Confederation: Prussia |

Commanders and leaders
| Pierre Taillant; Major Talhouet | Prince Friedrich; Wilhelm von Tümpling; Major Von Giese |

Units involved
| Garde Mobile | VI Corps |

Strength
| One battalion of 63rd Line Regiment, 100 artillerymen, one Garde Mobile battalion and 500 native Algerian soldiers and Zouaves | 12th Division of the VI Corps |

Casualties and losses
| 52 officers and 1,837 – 1,839 captured, 65 artillery pieces and many war reserves were seized | 1 officer and 1 soldier wounded |

The siege of Phalsbourg was an early battle of the Franco-Prussian War that was fought between the French Empire (later French Republic) against Germany at Phalsbourg near the Vosges beginning on 10 August 1870, and ending on 12 December of the same year.

== Background ==
After a siege that lasted for four months, a French garrison was stationed at Phalsbourg under the command of the officer Talhouet was forced to surrender unconditionally to the German forces under the command of Major Von Giese (which had replaced the 12th division under the command of General Wilhelm von Tümpling of the corps VI of Prussia to carry out the siege). The victory at Phalsbourg gave the Prussian army a lot of prisoners, including officers and soldiers of France, and who Prussia gave his prisoner of Water Germany. All gunscannon of troops France would have been destroyed during the siege took place Phalsbourg. The fall of Phalsbourg was one of the successive victories of the German army in the war. The strong defense of the French army at Phalsbourg was appreciated, and the courage and skill of the numerically weak German siege forces were also positively recognized.

== The Battle ==
Fort Phalsbourg was dominating the roads from Strasbourg to Nancy and Paris, and was one of the French fortresses that has declared a state of siege since the outbreak of the Franco-Prussian War: from In early August 1870, the German Third Army approached the fortress. Forces of the German 12th Division received the responsibility to capture the fortress, and began the blockade of Phalsburg on the afternoon of 13 August. After the French refused to surrender, German troops under Crown Prince Friedrich Wilhelm launched a shelling of the walls of Phalsbourg. Under heavy German artillery fire, many structures were destroyed, and the French garrison's defenses were swept away, but Major Talhouet commanded the army. The French garrison refused the German offer. Faced with this situation, VI Corps had to leave Phalsbourg to continue its advance, leaving 2 battalions to observe Phalsbourg. But during 18 – 19 August, many militia units Landwher and Schlesien Together with a German battery, they replaced the original besiegers, and officially blockaded Phalsbourg. On 24 August, the French made a breakthrough against the village of Unter-Eichen-Baracken and achieved an initial victory, before being repulsed by Prussian reinforcements. Over the next few days, the French also carried out several raids with similar results. Although the Prussian siege army was reinforced, in early September, the French launched another siege and were crushed. During the siege, the Prussian army was extremely cautious, as French franc-tireur forces often operated around Lützelburg, before the Franc-tireur moved south in early October.

The terrain of Phalsbourg proved difficult for the besiegers, but after a long time the situation showed the Germans the need for a bombardment. On 24 November, a brief artillery barrage broke out, and French artillery resistance was unable to inflict significant damage on the enemy. The French garrison was in dire straits, and on 11 December the Germans refused the conditional surrender of France, and some of the French Garde Mobile soldiers fled. from the fortress. On 12 December, the French surrendered and the German army entered Phalsbourg on 14 December, the same day as the fall of Fort Montmédy. The cause of the surrender of the French army at Phalsbourg was attributed to food shortages and an epidemic of smallpox, and Major Giese has been commended for his persistence during this successful siege.
