= Battle of Fehrbellin =

1675 battle

Coordinates: 52°47′59″N 12°46′00″E

- Part of the Scanian War (Northern Wars); Franco-Dutch War
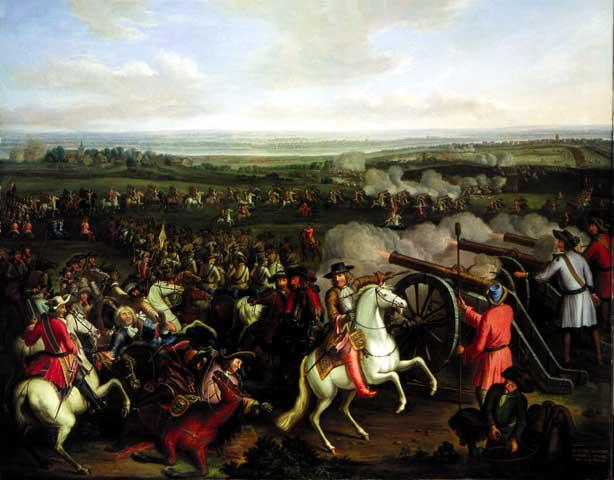
- The Battle of Fehrbellin by Dismar Degen
Date	June 18, 1675
Location	near Fehrbellin, Margraviate of Brandenburg
Result	Brandenburgian victory

Belligerents
(Margraviate of Brandenburg) Brandenburg-Prussia	(yes) Swedish Empire

Commanders and leaders
(Margraviate of Brandenburg) Frederick William (Margraviate of Brandenburg) Georg von Derfflinger (Margraviate of Brandenburg) Hesse-Homburg	(Swedish Empire) Waldemar Wrangel

Strength
6,000–7,000 men, 13 cannons	7,000, 28 cannons

Casualties and losses
500 killed and wounded	500–600 killed, wounded and captured

The Battle of Fehrbellin was a battle in the Scanian War. It was fought on June 18, 1675 (Julian calendar date, June 28, Gregorian), between Swedish and Brandenburg-Prussian troops. The Swedes, under Count Waldemar von Wrangel (stepbrother of Riksamiral Carl Gustaf Wrangel), had invaded and occupied parts of Brandenburg from their possessions in Pomerania, but were repelled by the forces of Frederick William, the Great Elector, under his Feldmarschall Georg von Derfflinger near the town of Fehrbellin. Along with the Battle of Warsaw (1656), Fehrbellin was crucial in establishing the prestige of Frederick William and Brandenburg-Prussia's army.

== Prelude ==
Prior to the battle the Swedes and Brandenburg had been allies in various wars against the Kingdom of Poland. However, when Elector Frederick William during the Franco-Dutch War had joined an allied expedition with Emperor Leopold I to Alsace against the forces of King Louis XIV of France, the French persuaded Sweden, which had been increasingly isolated on the continent, to attack Brandenburg while her army was away.

When Frederick William, encamping at Erstein, heard of the attack and occupation of a large part of his principality in December 1674, he immediately drew his army out of the coalition but had to take winter quarters at Marktbreit in Franconia. Leaving on 26 May 1675, he marched 250 kilometres (160 mi) to Magdeburg in only two weeks. This feat was considered one of the great marches in military history. He did it by abandoning his supply wagons and leaving large parts of the infantry behind, having his army buy supplies from the locals, but forbidding pillaging. The Swedes did not expect him to arrive that early.

Once he returned to Brandenburg, Frederick William realized that the Swedish forces, occupying the swampy Havelland region between Havelberg and the town of Brandenburg, were dispersed and ordered Derrflinger to take the central town of Rathenow in order to split them roughly down the middle. The elector bribed a local official loyal to him to hold a large and elaborate banquet for the Swedish officers of the fortress in order to get them drunk before the assault began in the night of June 14. This ruse, combined with the speed of the Elector's advance made the Swedes unaware of his arrival. Field Marshal Derfflinger then personally led an attack on Rathenow with 7,000 cavalry and 1,000 musketeers, his approach slowed but hidden by heavy rain. Derfflinger impersonated a Swedish officer and convinced the guards to open the gates of the town by claiming that a Brandenburgian patrol was after him. Once the gates were opened for him, he led a charge of 1,000 dragoons against the city and the rest of the army soon followed.

Once Derfflinger had forced the Swedish garrison from Rathenow, Wrangel pulled back his troops toward Havelberg. His progress was greatly impeded by marshes that the summer rains had turned treacherous. On June 17, the Brandenburgian troops reached Nauen. Meanwhile, Frederick William's advance parties, under the command of Colonel Joachim Hennings and guided by locals, blocked the exits of the area. The Swedes, who had planned to cross the Elbe river in order to join forces with Brunswick troops, were forced back to their last position at Fehrbellin.

== Battle ==
The Swedish commander, Wrangel, found himself hemmed in by a destroyed bridge over the Rhin river by the town of Fehrbellin. Impassable marshes on both flanks left Wrangel little choice but to give battle south of the nearby village of Hakenberg while his engineers repaired the span.

Map of the Battle of Fehrbellin

A total of 6,000–7,000 Brandenburgers with 13 cannons faced 7,000 Swedes with 28 guns. Wrangel omitted to secure the surrounding heights, and Frederick William and Derfflinger, by placing their guns on a series of low hills to his left while the Swedes had only swamps to their flanks and a river behind them, gained a decisive tactical advantage.

These guns opened fire around noon on the 18th and caused heavy casualties on the Swedish right flank. Wrangel, now fully aware of the threat, attempted several times to wrest control of the hills but was stopped each time by the Brandenburgian cavalry. This continued for some hours until Frederick William had his main attack press the right flank of the Swedes, eventually causing their cavalry to flee. The Brandenburgian cavalry, led by Prince Frederick II of Hesse-Homburg, then turned and routed the now unprotected Swedish infantry, a brigade of Generalmajor Henrik von Delwig. The Swedish right however had held up long enough though for the Fehrbellin bridge to be repaired and Wrangel was able to get a large portion of his army across before darkness fell. Frederick William rejected all his officers' suggestions to shell the town.

The Brandenburg troops lost about 500 men. Wrangel's forces lost slightly more than the Brandenburgers but it is unclear exactly how many. The Swedish infantry under Delwig lost 300–400 men alone, with 200 additional losses mostly attributed to the cavalry. All in all, the Swedes had lost about 500–600 killed, wounded and captured in the battle Wrangel lost many more in the coming days' retreat due to the pursuit of Brandenburg troops and the wrath of local peasants, some of whom still remembered the Swedes' atrocities during the Thirty Years' War. Of the 1,200 Delwig brigade, all but 20 were killed or captured. Near Wittstock alone, some 300 Swedes and their officers were slain by peasant raiders. On top of the battle losses, raiding parties, desertion, and starvation meant that, by July 2, there were no more Swedish soldiers in the Mark.

== Historical significance ==
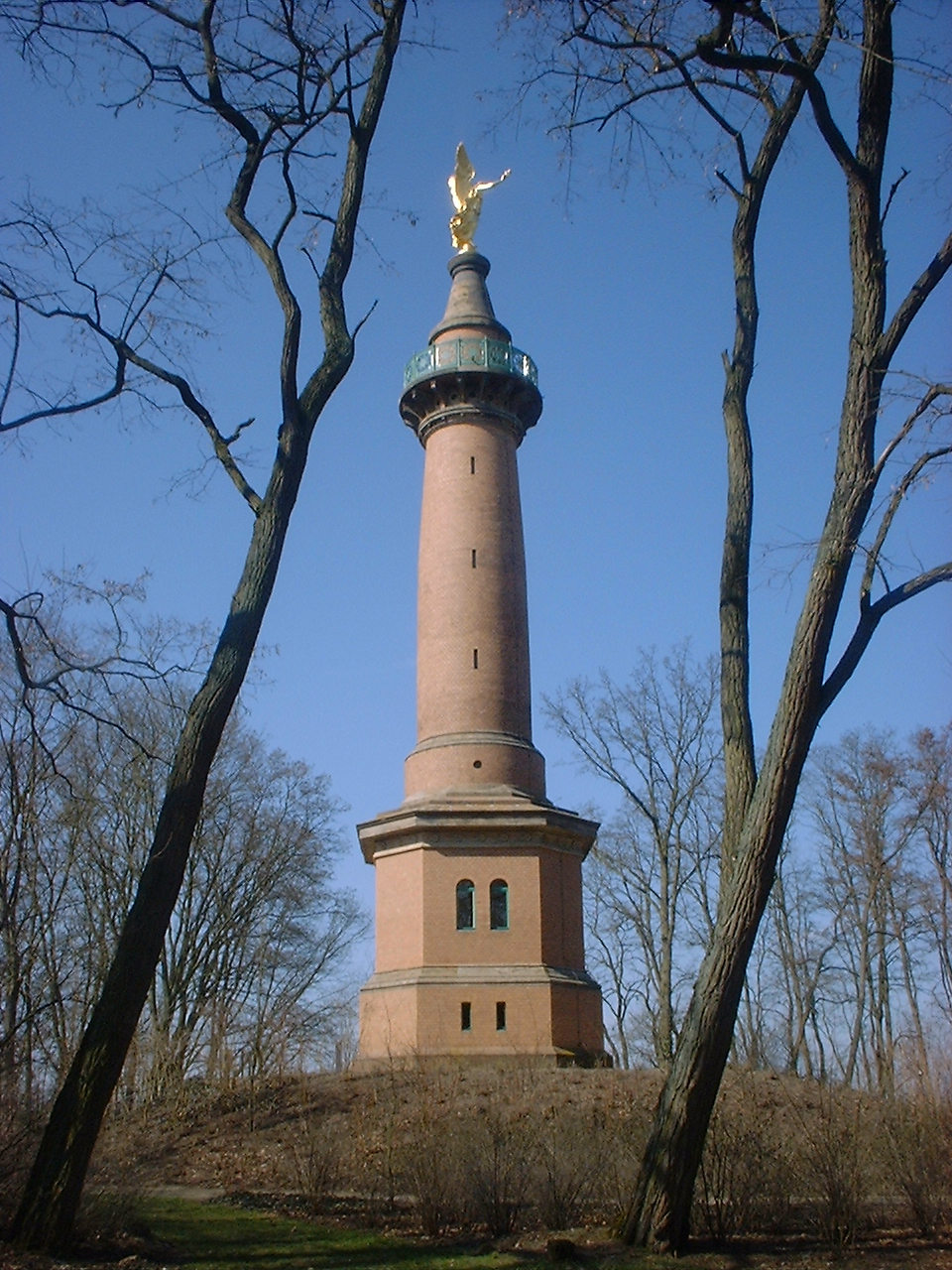
Memorial in Hakenberg near Fehrbellin

At the day of battle, the Swedes had no intention to deliver battle beyond joining their forces and moving off, exactly what they accomplished, while the Brandenburgers intended to prevent this, which failed. Regardless the battle became a watershed moment. By established military tradition since classical antiquity, the side that controlled the battlefield at the end was the victor. That honour clearly lay with the Brandenburgers, who proceeded to announce it to the world in no uncertain terms. Upon the Brandenburgian victory, the Holy Roman Empire and Denmark finally met their obligations and declared war on Sweden. While Frederick William's forces invaded Swedish Pomerania, the Swedes did not enter the margraviate again until the 1679 Peace of Saint-Germain-en-Laye, which—to the elector's great disappointment—largely restored the status quo ante bellum.

The victory at Fehrbellin had an enormous psychological impact: the Swedes, long considered unbeatable, had been bested and Brandenburg alone had prevailed against Swedish and French power politics. The victory boosted the Prince-Elector, age 56 at the time, who took an active role in the fighting, apparently having to be cut out of an encirclement by his dragoons. Frederick William henceforth was known as the "Great Elector", and the army that he and Derfflinger had led to victory eventually became the core of the future Prussian Army vital for the country's development as a European great power. Glorified in the course of rising German nationalism under the rule of the House of Hohenzollern in the 19th century, June 18 was a holiday that would be celebrated in Germany up until 1914.

In Sweden, the fiasco was one of the main accusation counts against the Privy Council aristocrats at the Riksdag of 1680, where the absolutism of Charles XI was declared.

== Reception ==
The Battle of Fehrbellin is the setting of Heinrich von Kleist's drama The Prince of Homburg written in 1809–10. However, the story of the prince's insubordination, later popularised by the Prussian king Frederick the Great, may be a legend.

An observation tower on the Hakenberg hill with a Victoria statue on top similar to the Berlin Victory Column commemorates the battle. It was erected from 1875 on the initiative of Crown Prince Frederick and inaugurated on September 2 (Sedantag), 1879.

In honor of the battle, Prussian bandmaster Richard Henrion ^{(de)} wrote Fehrbelliner Reitermarsch. Today it is the march of several modern Bundeswehr units.

== See also ==
- Wars and battles involving Prussia
- Swedish invasion of 1674/1675
