= Battle of Rathenow =

1675 battle

- Part of Swedish-Brandenburg War
- Capture of Rathenow
Date	15 June 1675
Location	Rathenow in Brandenburg
Result	Brandenburgian victory

Belligerents
(yes) Swedish Empire	Brandenburg-Prussia

Commanders and leaders
(Swedish Empire) Wangelin	(Brandenburg) Georg von Derfflinger (Brandenburg) von Götze

Strength
500, of which 70 men sick	8,000 of which 1,500–2,000 engaged

Casualties and losses
200 killed 270 captured	100 killed and mortally wounded

The Battle of Rathenow (German: Schlacht um Rathenow or Überfall von Rathenow) was the first engagement between the forces of Brandenburg-Prussia and Sweden in the Swedish-Brandenburg War (also called the Scanian War).

The battle took place on 15 June [O.S. 25 June] 1675 and ended with the capture of the town of Rathenow, the front of which had been occupied by Sweden, by the Brandenburg troops.

The Swedes, led by Colonel Wangelin, had about 500 men; the Brandenburg force, commanded by Field Marshal Georg von Derfflinger and General von Götze had some 1,500–2,000 men in the battle.

== Background ==
In 1674, Brandenburg entered the Franco-Dutch War against France and dispatched an army to Alsace. As a result, France persuaded Sweden to attack the undefended Electorate of Brandenburg. In late 1674, Swedish troops advanced from Swedish Pomerania well into the Electorate, thanks to the absence of any significant contingents of Brandenburg troops. Meanwhile, the main Brandenburg Army was fighting the French in the Rhineland. So the Swedes, who had entered the war on the French side and were under the command of Field Marshal Wrangel, were able to penetrate far into the state and occupy the city of Brandenburg without meeting any real resistance. The town of Rathenow was also occupied by Swedish troops, because Wrangel wanted to launch a crossing of the River Elbe at Havelberg from Rathenow and join forces with Hanoverian troops. His objective was the capture of the important Brandenburg fortress of Magdeburg. To that end the Swedish advance party under Colonel Wangelin occupied Rathenow (and Havelberg), initially to secure the Havel crossings and then push forward to Magdeburg.

On the other hand, the Elector of Brandenburg, Frederick William, wanted to halt the advance of the Swedes, attack the rear of the Swedish troops, and unite with those units of his own forces manning the fortress of Magdeburg.

== Ambush of Rathenow on 15 June 1675 ==
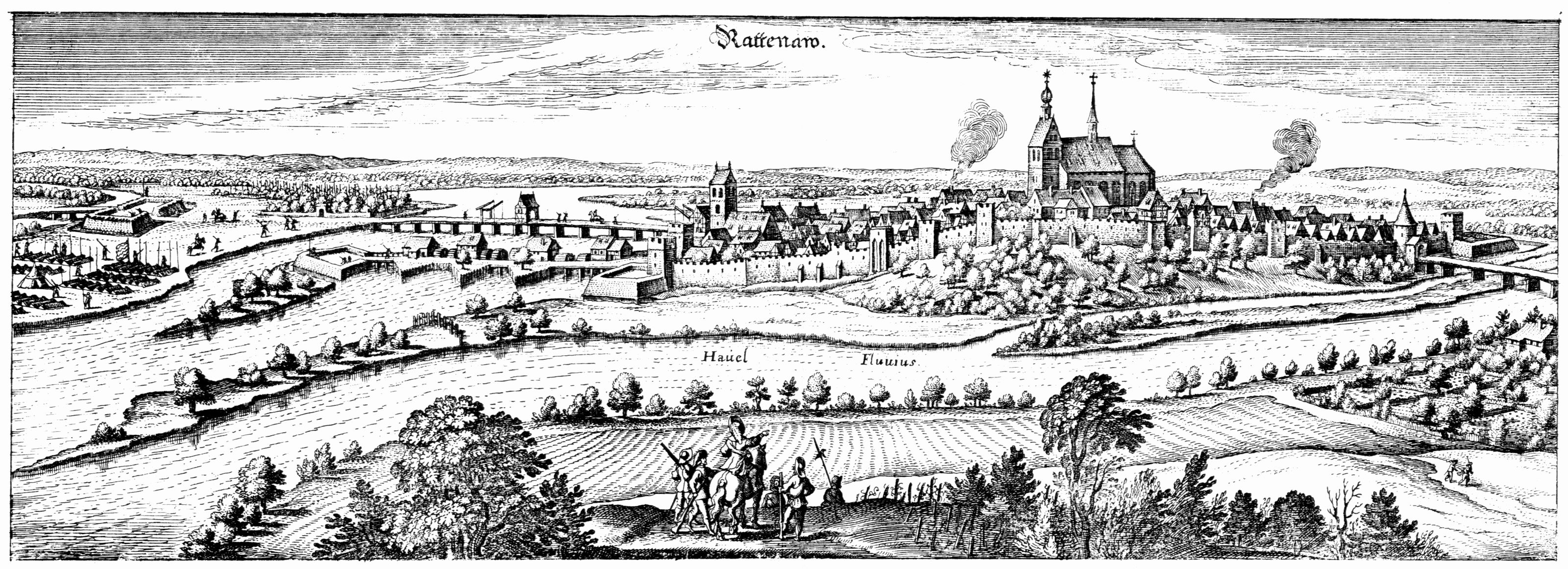
View of the town of Rathenow in 1633

The town of Rathenow was located on the eastern bank of the River Havel, protected to the west by a wide area of marsh between the main branches of the Havel, and was also surrounded by a moat. Of its medieval fortifications, only elements had survived, but these still offered adequate protection against an army not set on a long siege. So the gates were fortified and equipped with drawbridges.

The Brandenburg plan was to assault the town through its western gate, known as the Havel Gate (Haveltor). Their troops advanced under Field Marshal Georg von Derfflinger just before 2 clock over the Havel bridge. Derfflinger, who had been in Swedish service for a long time during the Thirty Years' War, rode at the head of the army accompanied by only a few dragoons and persuaded the guard to lower the drawbridge by speaking to them in fluent Swedish and asserting that: "he was a Swedish lieutenant of Bulow's Regiment from the garrison at Brandenburg and was on the run from the Brandenburg troops". This enabled the dragoons to break into the town. According to other reports, Derfflinger had ridden up to the gate alone, and only after it had been opened, did his dragoons rush to help in order to infiltrate into the town in a coup de main.

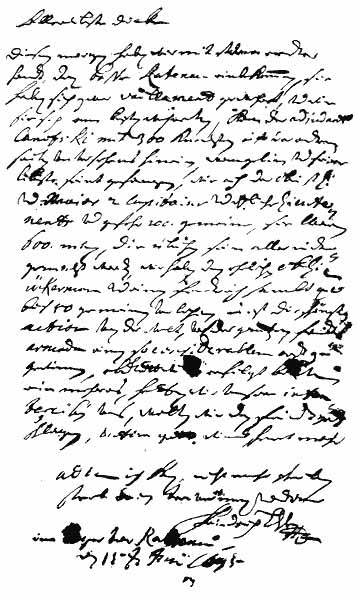
The letter from Frederick II of Hesse-Homburg of 15 June 1675 to his wife

Meanwhile, the Elector had Major General von Götze and 600 musketeers advance along the mill embankment to the Mill Gate (Mühlentor). Here fighting broke out, the Swedes proving able to hold their ground for the time being, aided by the town's fortifications. Another unit that attempted to enter the south side of the town from the Havel in boats, was also initially repulsed. Not until the second attack did the Brandenburgers succeed in entering the town. The assault on the Mill Gate also prevailed and General von Götze succeeded in capturing it. After vigorous fighting, the Swedish garrison was defeated and their commander, Swedish Colonel Wangelin, surrendered.

"My dearest, this morning we have taken the base of Ratenau by storm; they did indeed defend valiantly and, as they were fighting at their best, Adjutant Canolski entered by the side unobserved with 300 men. Wangelin and his comrades are taken prisoner, as well as the lieutenant colonel and major, 2 captains and some lieutenants, and about 100 men. They had 600 in all, the rest were all killed. We have lost the honorable Lt. Col. Ückermann and an ensign, together with 40 to 50 other ranks, it is the best operation in the world to capture such an important place in front of all the enemy armada. If God had wanted us to do more, had we had our infantry with us, we would have beaten the enemy soundly, in the end God wanted some to survive. Adieu, I can write no more. I die your faithful husband and your servant."

— Frederick L. z. Hesse, letter to his wife

== Outcome and aftermath of the battle ==
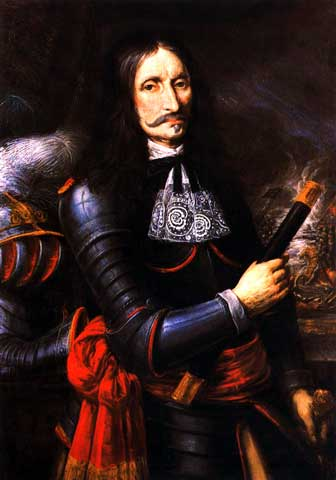
General Field Marshal of the Brandenburg forces in the battle: Georg von Derfflinger

The fight cost Sweden 200 dead and 270 prisoners. The Brandenburg troops lost only 100 men killed or mortally wounded. They also captured 500 to 600 horses from the Swedes.

The Swedes, hitherto perceived as invincible, had suffered their first defeat. As a consequence of this setback, the Swedes had to abandon their plan to cross the Elbe at Havelberg in the vicinity of Rathenow, in order to attack the key Brandenburg fortress of Magdeburg. Instead, the Swedish army, which was completely unsighted as to the strength and dispositions of their opponents, were forced to pull back to the north as quickly as possible in order to secure their now threatened supply lines.

Over the next few days, as a result of the pursuit launched by the Brandenburg army, this withdrawal became a thoroughly disorderly rout, that finally ended after 3 days on 28 June in the decisive defeat of the Swedes at the Battle of Fehrbellin.

== See also ==
- Wars and battles involving Prussia
