= Rathenow =

- Town
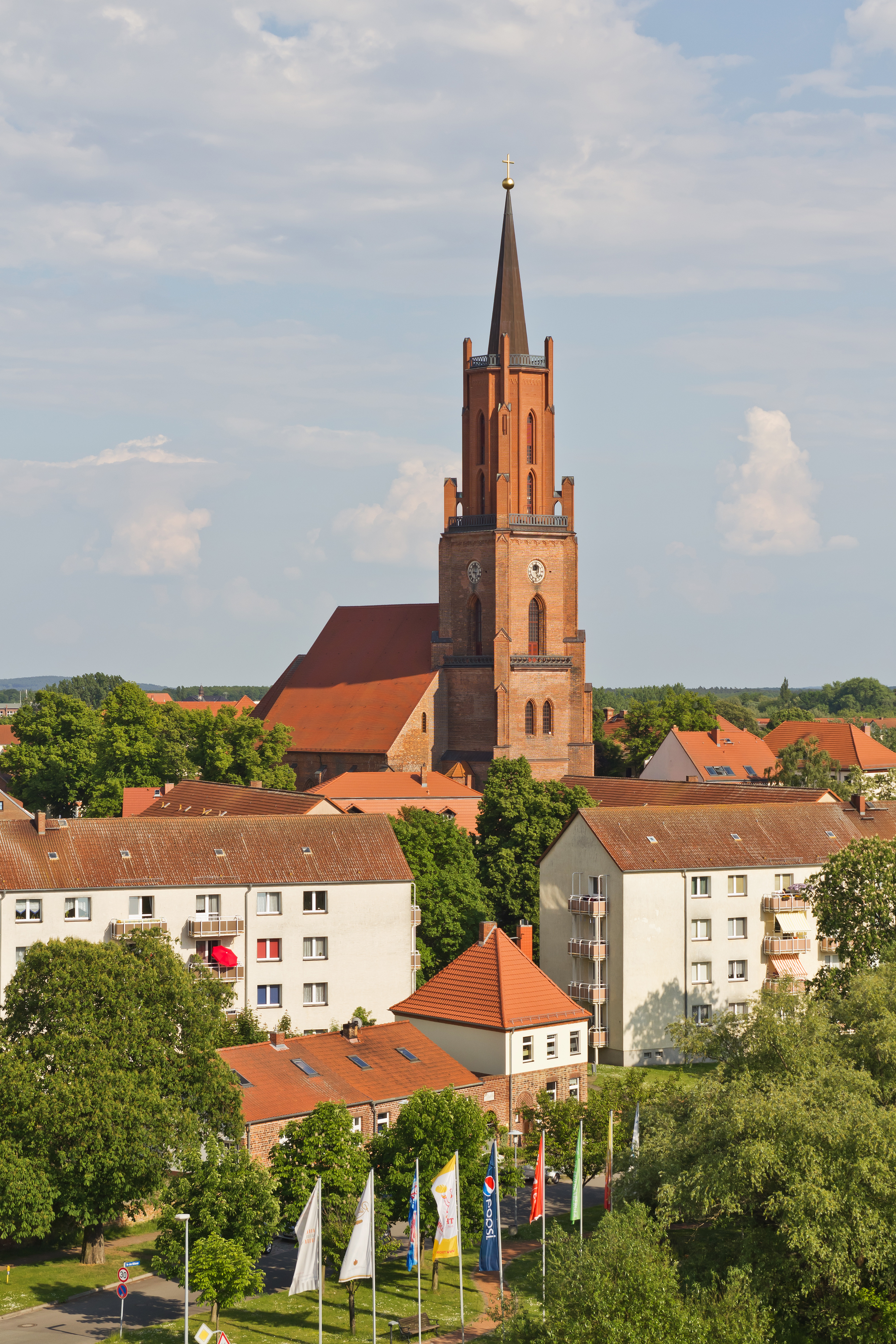
- Church

- Coat of arms

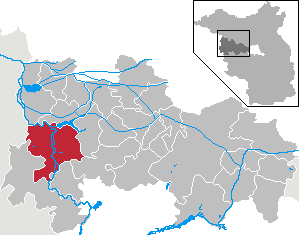
- Location of Rathenow within Havelland district
- Interactive map of Rathenow
- Location within Germany Location within Brandenburg
- Coordinates: 52°36′N 12°20′E
- Country: Germany
- State: Brandenburg
- District: Havelland
- Subdivisions: 6 Ortsteile

Government
  - Mayor (2022–30): Jörg Zietemann

Area
  - Total: 113.1 km^{2} (43.7 sq mi)
- Elevation: 29 m (95 ft)

Population (2025-12-31)
  - Total: 24,761
  - Density: 218.9/km^{2} (567.0/sq mi)
- Time zone: UTC+01:00 (CET)
  - Summer (DST): UTC+02:00 (CEST)
- Postal codes: 14702, 14712
- Dialling codes: 03385
- Vehicle registration: HVL
- Website: www.rathenow.de

Rathenow (German: [ˈʁaːtənoː]) is a town in the district of Havelland in Brandenburg, in eastern Germany, with a population of 24,063 (2020).

== Overview ==
The Protestant church of St. Marien Andreas, originally a basilica, and transformed to the Gothic style in 1517-1589, and the Roman Catholic Church of St. George, are noteworthy.

Rathenow is known for being the former capital of eyewear manufacturing in East Germany. It is also known for its stones, called Rathenow stones.

== History ==
In 1675, during the Scanian War, it was the site of a battle between Swedish and Brandenburgian forces.

During World War II, Rathenow was the location of a forced labour subcamp of the Nazi prison for women and juveniles in Berlin-Lichtenberg and a subcamp of the Sachsenhausen concentration camp. Prisoners of the latter were mostly Dutch, Belgian and French.

== Demographics ==
Development of Population since 1875 within the Current Boundaries (Blue Line: Population; Dotted Line: Comparison to Population Development of Brandenburg state)

Recent Population Development and Projections (Population Development before Census 2011 (blue line); Recent Population Development according to the Census in Germany in 2011 (blue bordered line); Official projections for 2005-2030 (yellow line); for 2017-2030 (scarlet line); for 2020-2030 (green line)

Rathenow: Population development
within the current boundaries (2020)

Year	Pop.	±% p.a.
1875	12,443	—
1890	18,841	+2.80%
1910	29,125	+2.20%
1925	32,056	+0.64%
1939	37,449	+1.12%
1950	32,254	−1.35%
1964	31,083	−0.26%

Year	Pop.	±% p.a.
1971	31,834	+0.34%
1981	33,952	+0.65%
1985	33,312	−0.47%
1990	31,945	−0.83%
1995	30,498	−0.92%
2000	28,811	−1.13%
2005	26,973	−1.31%

Year	Pop.	±% p.a.
2010	25,301	−1.27%
2015	24,387	−0.73%
2016	24,243	−0.59%
2017	24,309	+0.27%
2018	24,309	+0.00%
2019	24,208	−0.42%
2020	24,179	−0.12%

== Twin towns — sister cities ==
Rathenow is twinned with:

- Złotów, Poland
- Rendsburg, Germany

== Notable people ==
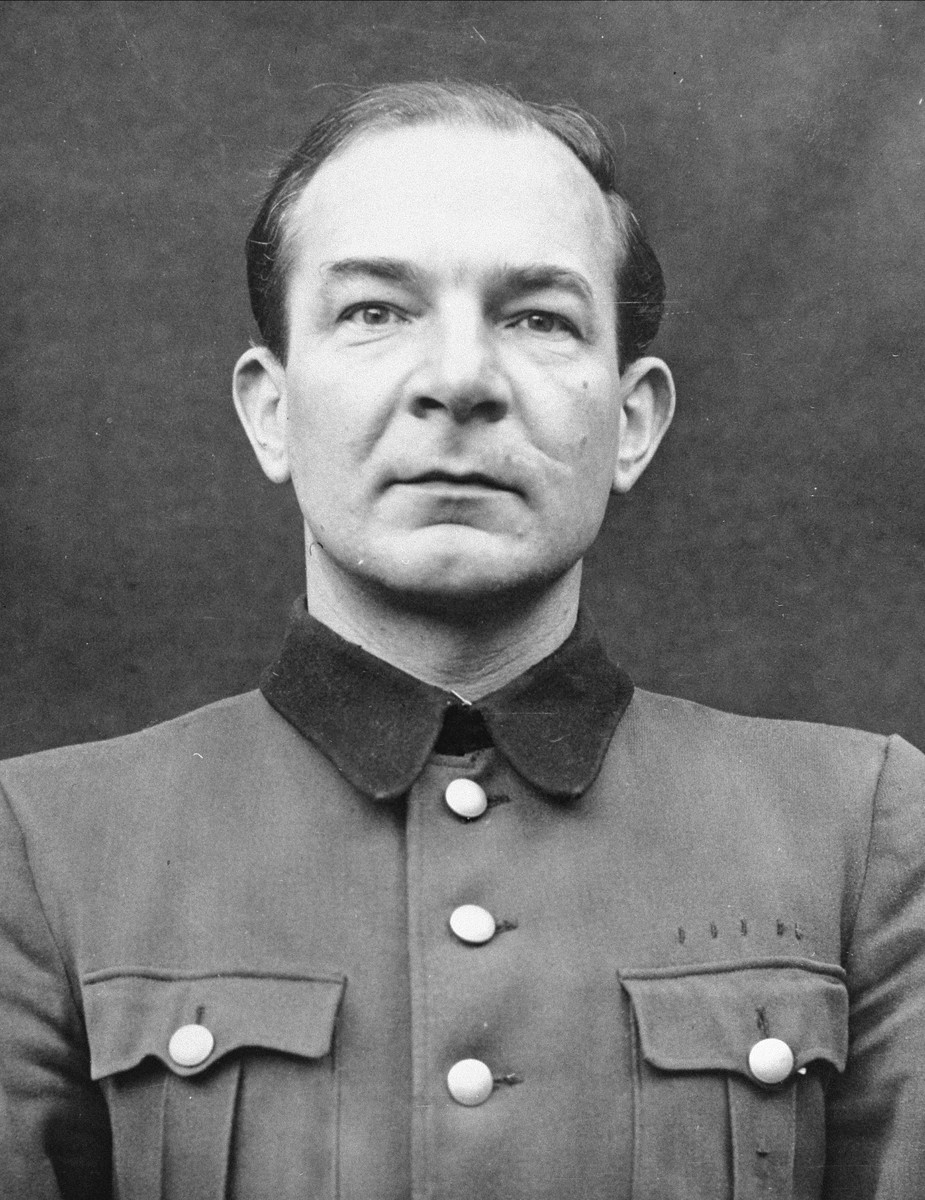
Joachim Mrugowsky during the Doctors' trial

- Christian Beeck (born 1971), footballer
- Stephan Bodecker (1384–1459), Bishop of Brandenburg
- Jörg Friedrich (rower) (born 1959), rower
- Jörg Freimuth (born 1961), high jumper
- Jörg Heinrich (born 1969), football player and manager
- Wulf Herzogenrath (born 1944), art historian and curator
- Rosemarie Köhn (1939–2022), 1993-2006 Bishop of Hamar (Norway) (world's second woman as a Lutheran bishop)
- Joachim Mrugowsky (1905–1948), physician and Nazi war criminal; executed
- Mario Streit (born 1967), rower
- Immo Stabreit (born 1933), diplomat
- George William Ziemann (1809–1881), Christian Missionary
