= African Studies Center, Boston University =

The African Studies Center (ASC) at Boston University is among the oldest and most respected African studies programs in the United States. Founded in 1953, BU's African Studies Center provides language and area studies training to students throughout Boston University. The ASC has been a long-time recipient of federal funding from the Title VI grant.

== History ==
A group of Boston University faculty with an interest in Africa, including George Lewis (geography), Zeb Reyna (psychology), William Newman (political science), Lyn Watson (anthropology), Al Zalinger (sociology), and Adelaide Cromwell (Sociology), began to meet in 1951 and approached the dean of the Graduate School about creating a program in African studies. William O. Brown, a State Department specialist in Africa, was recruited as the first director, and the center was launched in 1953. As director, Brown successfully secured funding from the Ford Foundation, which continued to support the ASC until the creation of the federal Title VI program in the 1970s. An early focus for the ASC was training officers for the US State Department.

The ASC has been a regular recipient of National Resource Center (NRC) and Foreign Language and Area Studies (FLAS) grants from the Title VI program in the US Department of Education. The ASC's Africa Outreach Program is well known for developing classroom resources and training K-12 teachers on how to include African studies in the classroom. The Outreach Program has also received several Fulbright-Hays Group Project Abroad (GPA) to take teachers on study trips to Africa and National Endowment for Humanities grants to support summer institutes.

Many top African studies scholars have been affiliated with the ASC, including Sara Berry (history), John Thornton (history), Linda Heywood (history), John Harris (economics), Norman Bennett (history), Wande Abimbola (religion and African languages), and James McCann (history). ASC faculty who have won the Herskovits Prize for the most important book in African studies include Sara Berry (1986), Diana Wylie (2002), Linda Heywood, John Thornton, and Parker Shipton (2008), and Fallou Ngom (2017).

== Programs ==
The African Studies Center has over 100 faculty affiliates from nearly every school, college, and department at Boston University. The ASC has sponsored the weekly Walter Rodney Seminar Series since 1976, presenting current research in African studies from a variety of disciplines. The annual Morse Lecture, named for Congressman and United Nations Development Program administrator F. Bradford Morse, has been given by top intellectuals and activists working on Africa, such as Paul Lovejoy, Adam Kuper, Celestin Monga, and International Criminal Court Chief Prosecutor Fatou Bensouda.

A primary activity of the ASC is instruction in African languages. The ASC African Language Program currently offers 7 languages: Akan Twi, Amharic, Hausa, Igbo, Swahili, Xhosa, and Zulu. The African Language Program has also recently offered Lingala and Kinyarwanda. Arabic is offered in BU's World Languages Department. The ASC also offers two undergraduate minors and a graduate certificate in African studies.

The ASC sponsors one of the largest African outreach programs in the country. Teaching Africa Outreach Program has developed numerous teaching materials, including teachers' guides, curriculum boxes for classroom use, DVDs, and posters. Teaching Africa Outreach Program has been the recipient of two NEH grants and three Fulbright-Hays grants to work with secondary and middle school teachers. Over 10,000 copies of the Outreach Program's poster, "How Big Is Africa?" have been distributed, and it has been reproduced in numerous publications.

== African Studies Center Directors ==
- William O. Brown
- John Harris
- James McCann
- James Pritchett
- Timothy Longman (2009-2017)
- Fallou Ngom (2017-2020)
- Michael Woldemariam (2021-)

== Notable alumni ==
- Barbara Cooper - History department chair, Rutgers University
- Zenani Mandela-Dlamini - Daughter of Nelson and Winnie Mandela
- Christopher Fomunyoh - Africa regional director at the National Democratic Institute
- Julie Livingston - Professor of history, cultural, and social analysis at NYU, 2015 MacArthur Genius Grant recipient
- Saki Macozoma - South African politicians and businessman
- Theodore Trefon - Researcher at the Royal Museum for Central Africa, Tervuren, Belgium
- Alexandria Ocasio-Cortez - American politician, participant in BU's study abroad in Niger.
