= The International Journal of African Historical Studies =

- Discipline: African history
- Language: English
- Edited by: Michael DiBlasi

Publication details
- Former name: African Historical Studies
- History: 1968–present
- Publisher: African Studies Center, Boston University (United States)

Standard abbreviations
- ISO 4: Int. J. Afr. Hist. Stud.

Indexing
- ISSN: 0361-7882
- LCCN: 2001-227402
- JSTOR: 03617882
- OCLC no.: 48537230

Links
- Journal homepage

The International Journal of African Historical Studies (IJAHS) publishes peer-reviewed articles on all aspects of African history. The journal was established in 1968 as African Historical Studies before changing to its current name in 1972. The journal publishes three issues per year (April/May, August/September, and December).
