= Christianity and Genocide in Rwanda =

2009 non-fiction book

- Author: Timothy Longman
- Genre: History
- Publisher: Cambridge University Press
- Publication date: 2009
- Pages: 350
- ISBN: 9780511642043
- OCLC: 608023535

Christianity and Genocide in Rwanda is a history book by Timothy Longman. It was published in 2009 by Cambridge University Press. The book is about the involvement of the Christian leaders and the Catholic church in the 1994 Rwandan Genocide, and the role Christianity played in the genocide

In a review published in Holocaust and Genocide Studies, Antony Court said the book treated the role of Christian churches in the genocide in "subtle, trenchant, and balanced terms". He ultimately agrees with Longman's assertion that Christian churches "with too few exceptions, went along with, facilitated, or even propagated" the genocide, specifically by teaching obedience to the state, creating divisions between the Hutu, Tutsi, and Twa ethnic groups. Jean-Marie Kamatali, in Journal of Church and State, was critical of the book. She accused Longman of using data "selectively", treating the churches as more unified in there policies that she feels they were, and for defining the actions of clergy members who defied the genocide as "heroic" instead of attributing them to the institutional policies of the church.
