= Timothy Longman =

American professor

Timothy Paul Longman (born February 10, 1964) is a professor of political science and international relations at Boston University. A protege of Alison Des Forges, he is recognized as one of the top authorities on the Rwandan genocide and its legacies.

== Career ==
Longman was born in Illinois and graduated from El Dorado High School in El Dorado, Kansas. He earned his undergraduate degree in religion and political science at Phillips University in Enid, Oklahoma. He received his PhD in Political Science at the University of Wisconsin-Madison, with a certificate in African studies. At UW, Longman studied with M. Crawford Young, Aili M. Tripp, Murray Edelman, and Jan Vansina, among others. His dissertation focused on the involvement of Christian churches in the 1994 Rwandan genocide. After completing his PhD, he served as the head of the field office of Human Rights Watch and the International Federation for Human Rights (FIDH) in Rwanda, conducting research for and helping to write the report, Leave None to Tell the Story. From 1996 to 2009, he taught at Vassar College, before moving to Boston University. Longman served as director of the African Studies Center, Boston University from 2009 to 2017. In 2017, he became the director of BU's Institute on Culture, Religion, and World Affairs (CURA). He has previously held research and teaching appointments at the Human Rights Center at University of California, Berkeley; the International Human Rights Exchange at the University of the Witwatersrand in Johannesburg, South Africa; the National University of Rwanda; Drake University; and Columbia University.

In addition to his teaching positions, Longman has served as an expert witness in a dozen trials related to the Rwandan genocide held in the United States, Canada, Finland, Sweden, and the United Kingdom, as well as testifying in the International Criminal Tribunal for Rwanda in Arusha, Tanzania. He has also served as a consultant for Human Rights Watch, the International Center for Transitional Justice, and USAID in Rwanda, Burundi, the Democratic Republic of Congo, and Uganda. Longman has served on the Executive Committee of the African Studies Association.

== Publications ==
=== Human Rights Watch Reports ===
Longman is listed as a researcher and contributing author to Leave None to Tell the Story, the report on the 1994 Rwandan genocide of the Tutsi written primarily by Alison Des Forges. He wrote the chapters on the genocide in the commune of Nyakizu, one of the three local-case studies in the book. Leave None to Tell the Story is widely recognized as the definitive account of the Rwandan genocide and was awarded the 2000 Raphael Lemkin Book Award from the Institute for the Study of Genocide for the best book "that focuses on explanations of genocide, crimes against humanity, state mass killings and gross violations of human rights, and strategies to prevent such crimes and violations."

While he was directing the HRW/FIDH field office in 1995–96, he researched and wrote a report on attacks against ethnic Tutsi in the Democratic Republic of Congo (then called Zaire). He also participated in the research and publication of "Shattered Lives," a report that focused on sexual violence during the 1994 genocide. This report was instrumental in pushing the International Criminal Tribunal for Rwanda to bring charges of sexual assault against genocide perpetrators, with the case against Jean-Paul Akayesu setting the precedent that sexual violence could be considered a genocide crime. Longman also wrote reports for Human Rights Watch on attacks on civilians in the two Congolese wars. In 1997, Longman conducted research in Burundi with journalist Molly Bingham on attacks against civilians in the civil war there.

=== Publications on Religion in the 1994 Rwanda Genocide ===
Much of Longman's published work focuses on religion in Rwanda, which is an overwhelmingly Christian country. Longman's first book, Christianity and Genocide in Rwanda, analyzes the involvement of Rwanda's Christian churches in the 1994 genocide. In the book, Longman explores the history of Christianity in Rwanda and argues that churches in the country maintained a close relationship with political power and practiced ethnic discrimination from their foundation. He notes that in the early 1990s some voices in the Christian churches were promoting democracy, fighting for human rights, and opposing ethnic violence, but that the most church leaders strongly supported the regime that ultimately carried out genocide. Longman writes that church support helped make the genocide possible by giving it moral support. “Christians could kill without obvious qualms of conscience, even in the church, because Christianity as they had always known it had been a religion defined by struggles for power, and ethnicity had always been at the base of those struggles”

=== Publications on Post-Genocide Rwanda ===
Longman has also published extensively on efforts to rebuild post-genocide Rwanda, most notably in his 2017 book, Memory and Justice in Post-Genocide Rwanda. In this book, Longman looks at the many transitional justice programs that the post-genocide government has implemented, including the grassroots gacaca courts, and how the Rwandan population has responded. He concludes that transitional justice programs in Rwanda have done more to help the Rwandan Patriotic Front government to consolidate its power than to promote justice and reconciliation. The book is based on research conducted when Longman was affiliated with the Human Rights Center at the University of California, Berkeley, that was funded by the MacArthur Foundation, the United States Institute of Peace, the Sandler Foundation, and the Hewlett Foundation. The book received honorable mention for the Melville J. Herskovits Prize and the Bethwell Ogot Book Prize from the African Studies Association and was named the 2017 best book in African politics by the African Politics Conference Group.
