= Africa Palace =

Palace in Tervuren, Belgium

- Afrikapaleis (Dutch); Palais d'Afrique (French)
- Front view of the Africa Palace
- Former names: Palace of the Colonies
- Alternative names: Palace of Africa

General information
- Type: Palace
- Architectural style: Neoclassical
- Location: Tervuren, Flemish Brabant, Belgium
- Coordinates: 50°49′43″N 4°30′55″E
- Current tenants: Royal Museum for Central Africa (RMCA)
- Completed: 1897
- Client: King Leopold II

Design and construction
- Architect: Alfred-Philibert Aldrophe

Website
- afrikapaleis.be

The Africa Palace or Palace of Africa (Dutch: Afrikapaleis; French: Palais d'Afrique or Palais de l'Afrique) is a neoclassical palace in Tervuren in Flemish Brabant, Belgium, just outside Brussels. It was originally built in 1897 by order of King Leopold II to house the colonial section of the 1897 International Exposition. Nowadays, it is part of the Royal Museum for Central Africa (RMCA), and houses offices, storage rooms, classrooms and a reception hall. It was formerly called the Palace of the Colonies (Dutch: Koloniënpaleis or Paleis der Koloniën; French: Palais des Colonies) until 2018.

== History ==
=== International Exposition (1897) ===
The Palace of the Colonies was built in 1897 by order of King Leopold II to plans by the French architect Alfred-Philibert Aldrophe to host the first Congo Exhibition (colonial section of the 1897 International Exposition). The exhibition, divided into four sections, displayed ethnographic objects, stuffed animals and Congolese export products (e.g. coffee, cacao and tobacco). In the main hall, known as the Hall of the Great Cultures (French: Salon des Grandes Cultures), the architect and decorator Georges Hobé designed a distinctive wooden Art Nouveau structure to evoke a Congolese forest, using Bilinga wood, an African tree. In the classical gardens, designed by the French landscape architect Elie Lainé, a temporary "human zoo"—a copy of an African village—was built, in which 267 Congolese people lived for the duration of the exhibition. Seven of them died during their forced stay in Belgium.

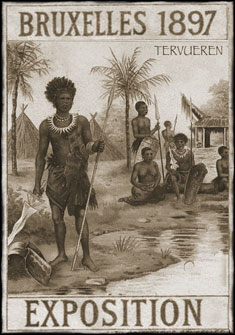
Poster for the colonial section of the 1897 International Exposition

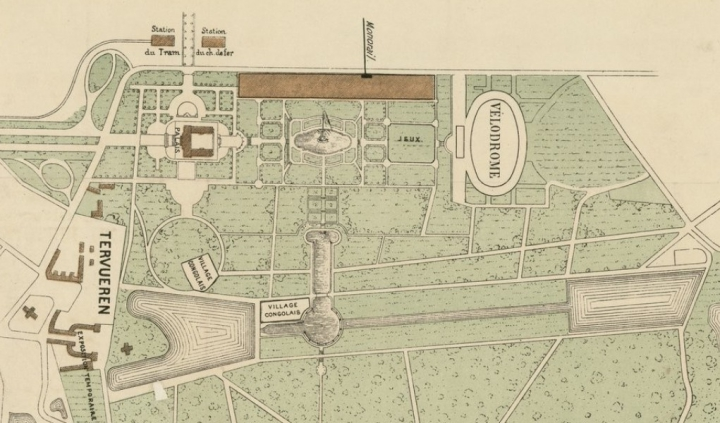
Plan of the colonial section of the 1897 World's Fair in Tervuren

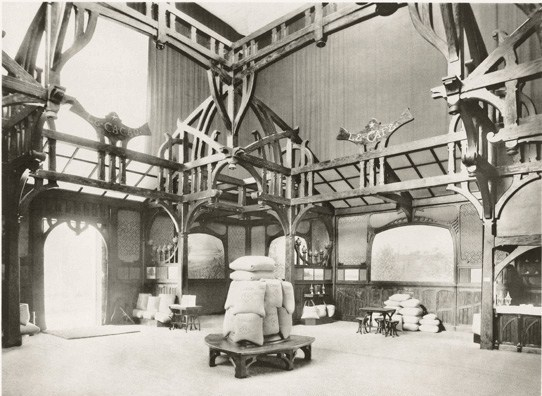
Wooden structure by Georges Hobé in the Hall of the Great Cultures during the exhibition

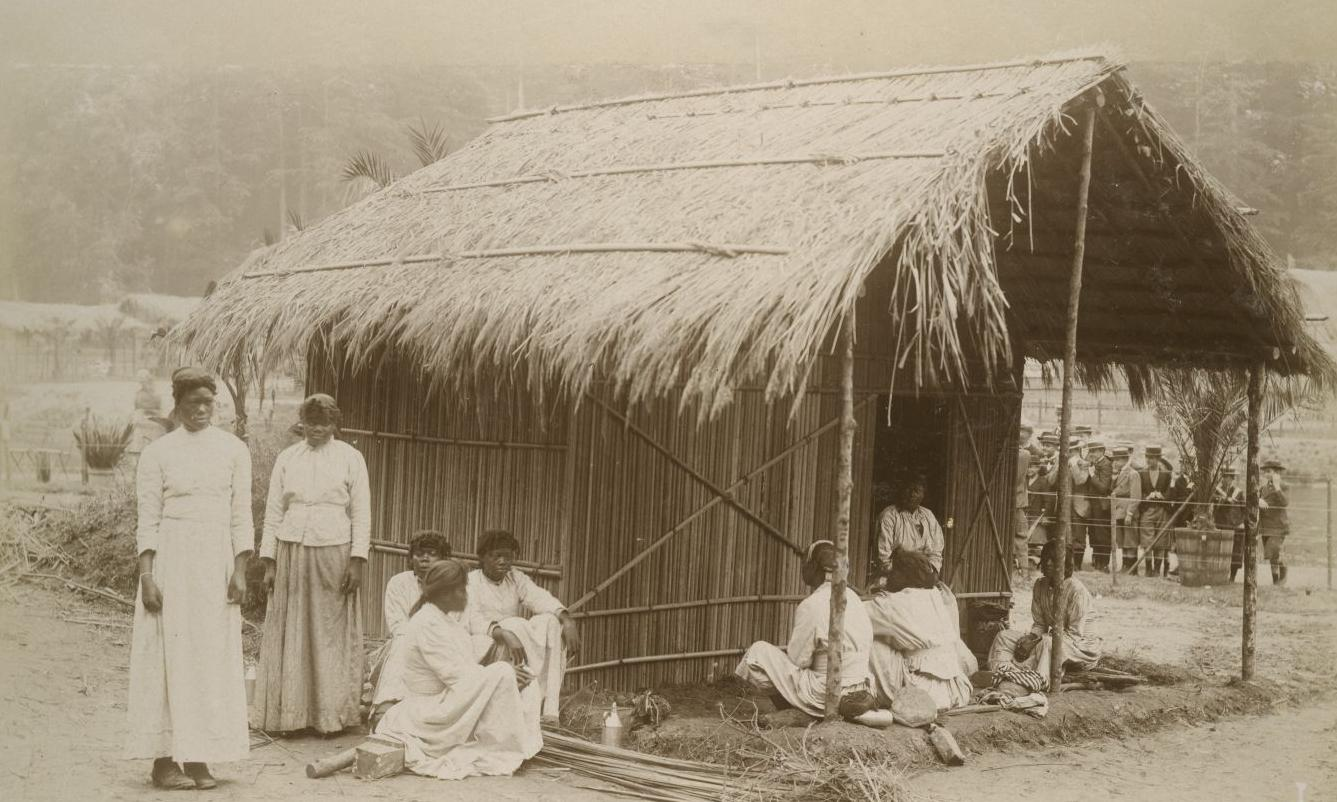
The 'Congolese Village' human zoo during the exhibition

=== Later history ===
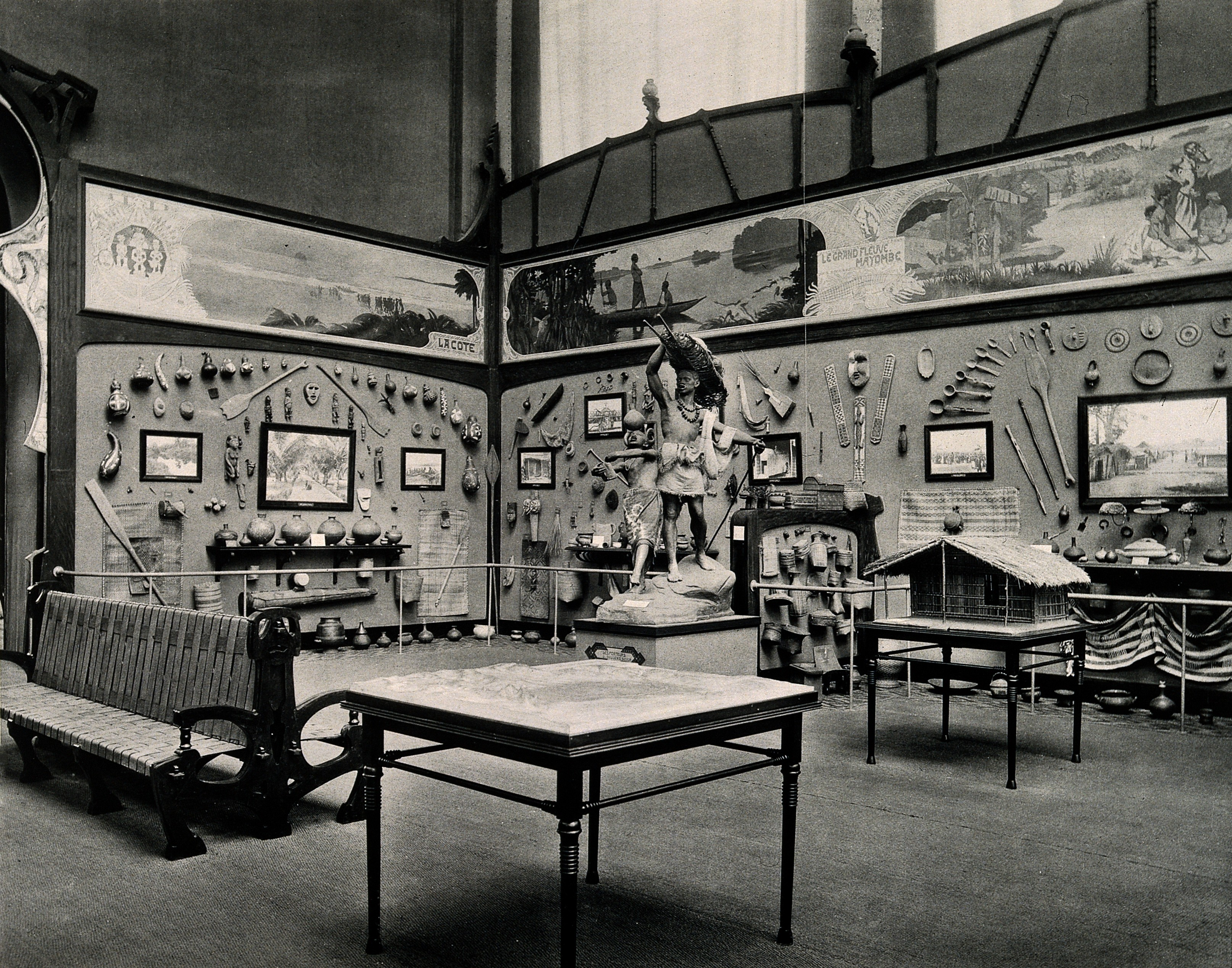
The interior of the original exhibit in the Palace of the Colonies

The exhibition's success led to the permanent establishment, in 1898, of the Museum of the Congo (French: Musée du Congo, Dutch: Museum van Kongo), a museum and a scientific institution for the dissemination of colonial propaganda and support for Belgium's colonial activities, and a permanent exhibition was installed in the Palace of the Colonies. The museum began to support academic research, but due to the avid collecting of the scientists, the collection soon grew too large for the museum and enlargement was needed. Tervuren, which had become a rich suburb of Brussels, was once again chosen as the location of the enlarged museum. Named the Museum of the Belgian Congo (French: Musée du Congo Belge, Dutch: Museum van Belgisch-Kongo), it moved in 1910 to a nearby larger building, designed by the French architect Charles Girault, where the institution is still located under the name AfricaMuseum. During the museum's renovation in 2018, the Palace of the Colonies was renamed the Africa Palace or Palace of Africa.

== Description ==
=== Structure ===
The palace consists of a rectangular central wing with seven bays and two square side wings with three bays each (to which must be added two modern red brick wings located to the north-east and south-east). Its façades have a polychromy resulting from the combination of blue and white stone, reinforced by the white colour of the woodwork. The building, preceded by a staircase lined with statues of Egyptian sphinxes and a paved esplanade, is surmounted over its entire length by a smooth entablature decorated with drop triglyphs, which supports a strongly projecting cornice surmounted by a balustrade.

=== Central wing ===
The central wing of seven bays is dominated by a projecting central body, preceded by a staircase and bordered by flat bossages with braced wall lines. This central body has three bays delimited by columns of colossal order surmounted by Ionic capitals embellished with garlands. These columns support the entablature and a large triangular pediment. The central body is extended by four bays (two on the left and two on the right) of similar structure, the columns being replaced by flat pilasters. At the level of these seven bays, the ground floor is pierced by large French windows with semi-circular transoms surmounted by a key with acanthus leaves and spandrels adorned with laurel leaves, while the upstairs is pierced with rectangular windows with braces.

=== Side wings ===
The neoclassical side wings, with a square plan of three bays out of three, present a rather different structure. If we find back the flat bossages with braced lines, the pilasters with Ionic capitals, the entablature, the projecting cornice and the balustrade, the openings are on the other hand totally different. The central bay is pierced by a small door surmounted by an enormous arched window with projecting transoms, a molded arch and blue stone keystone whose spandrels are stamped with the monogram of Leopold II consisting of two letters "L" arranged symmetrically. The side bays, for their part, are decorated, on the ground floor, with an arched niche, and on the first floor, with a smooth oval cartouche surrounded by a garland of laurel and ribbons.

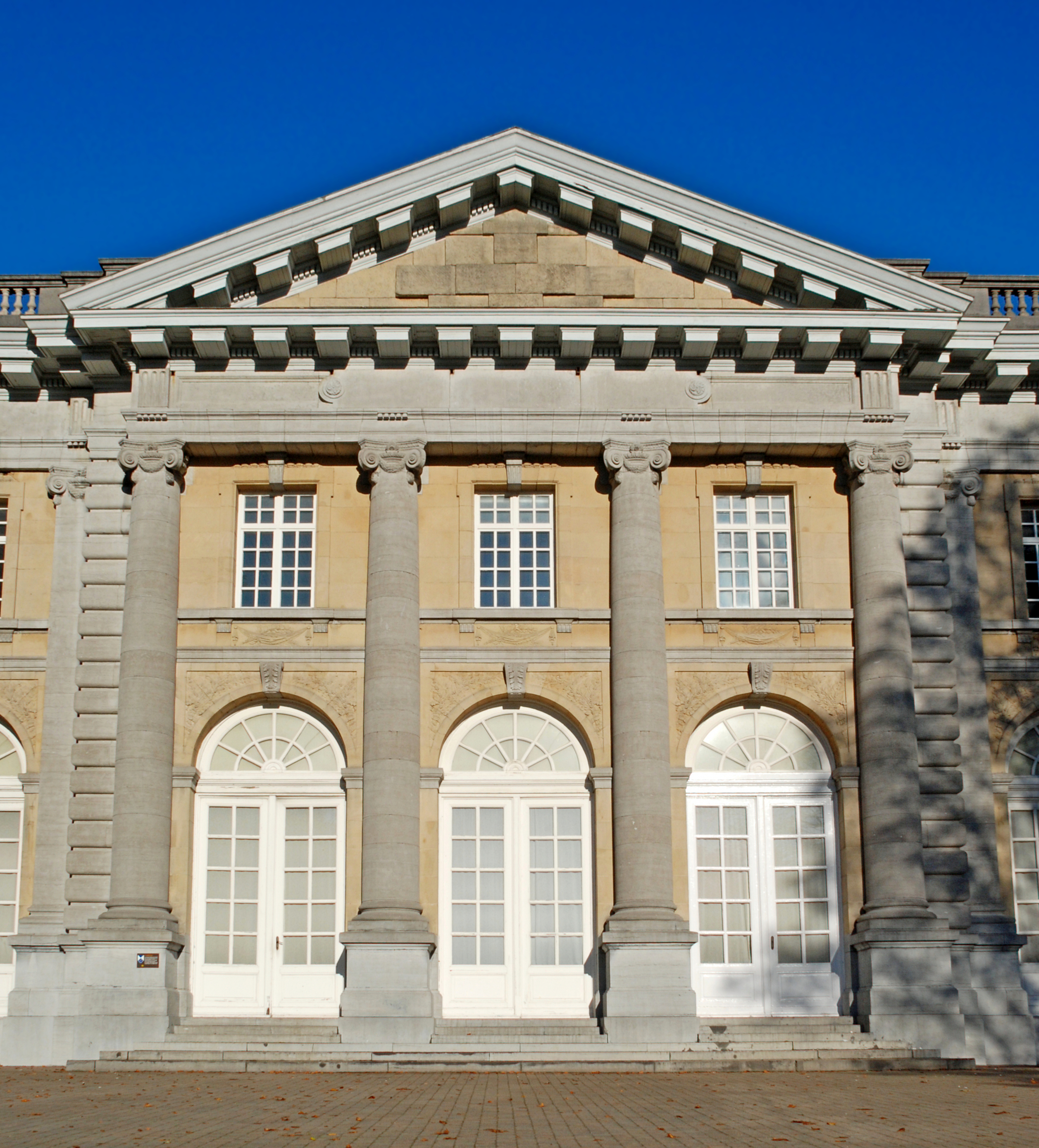
Central wing

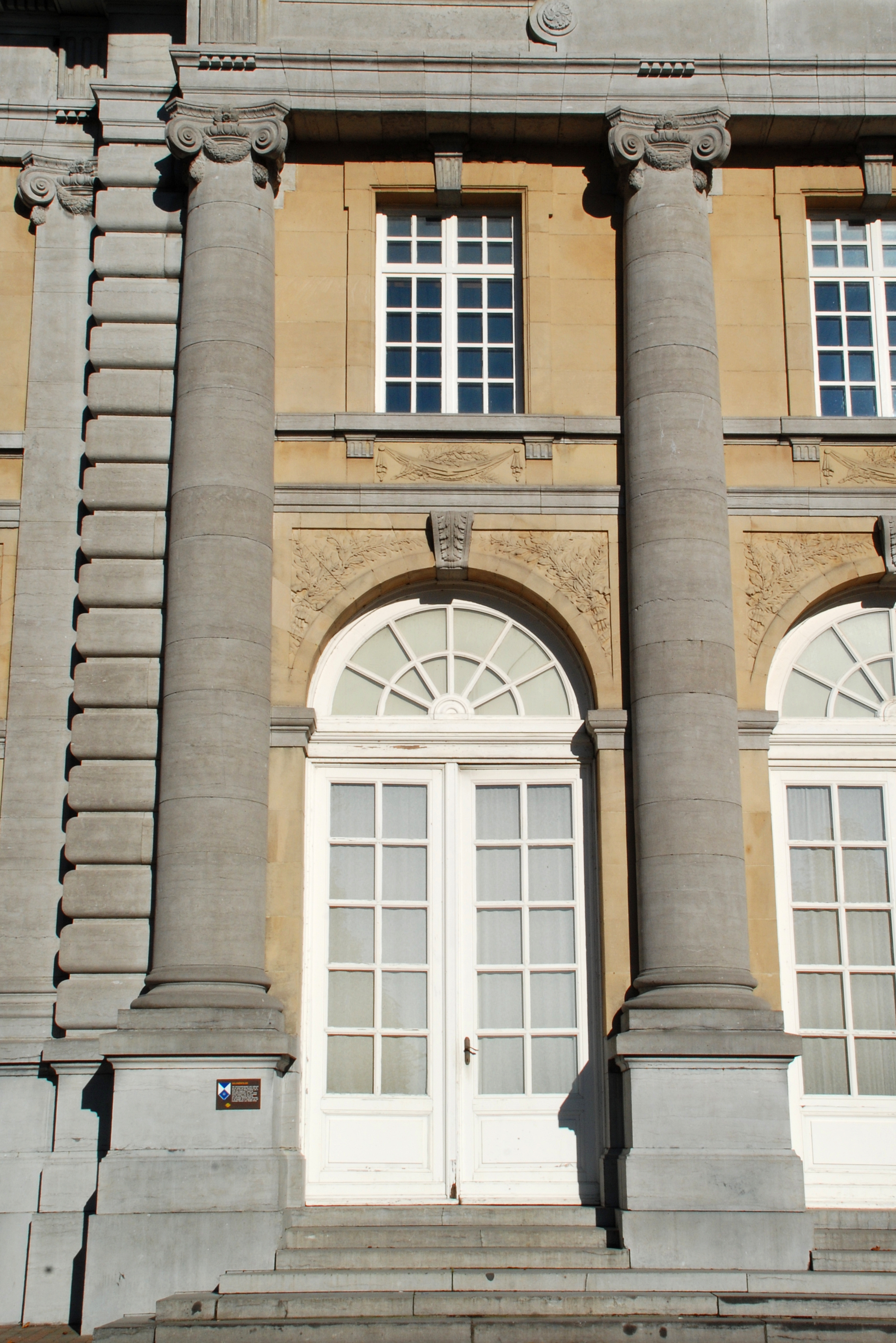
Columns of the central wing

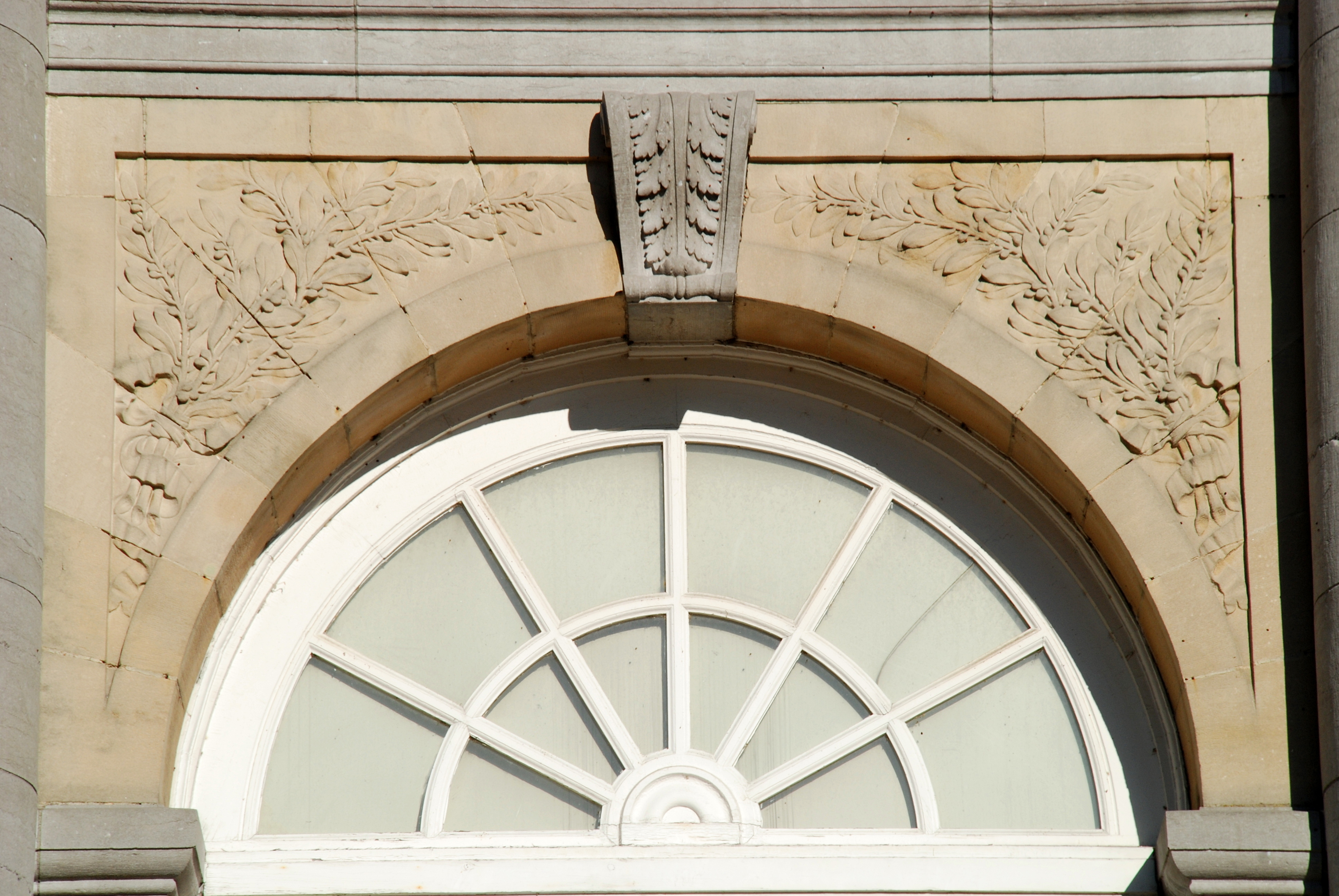
Transom surmounted by a key with acanthus leaves and spandrels adorned with laurel leaves

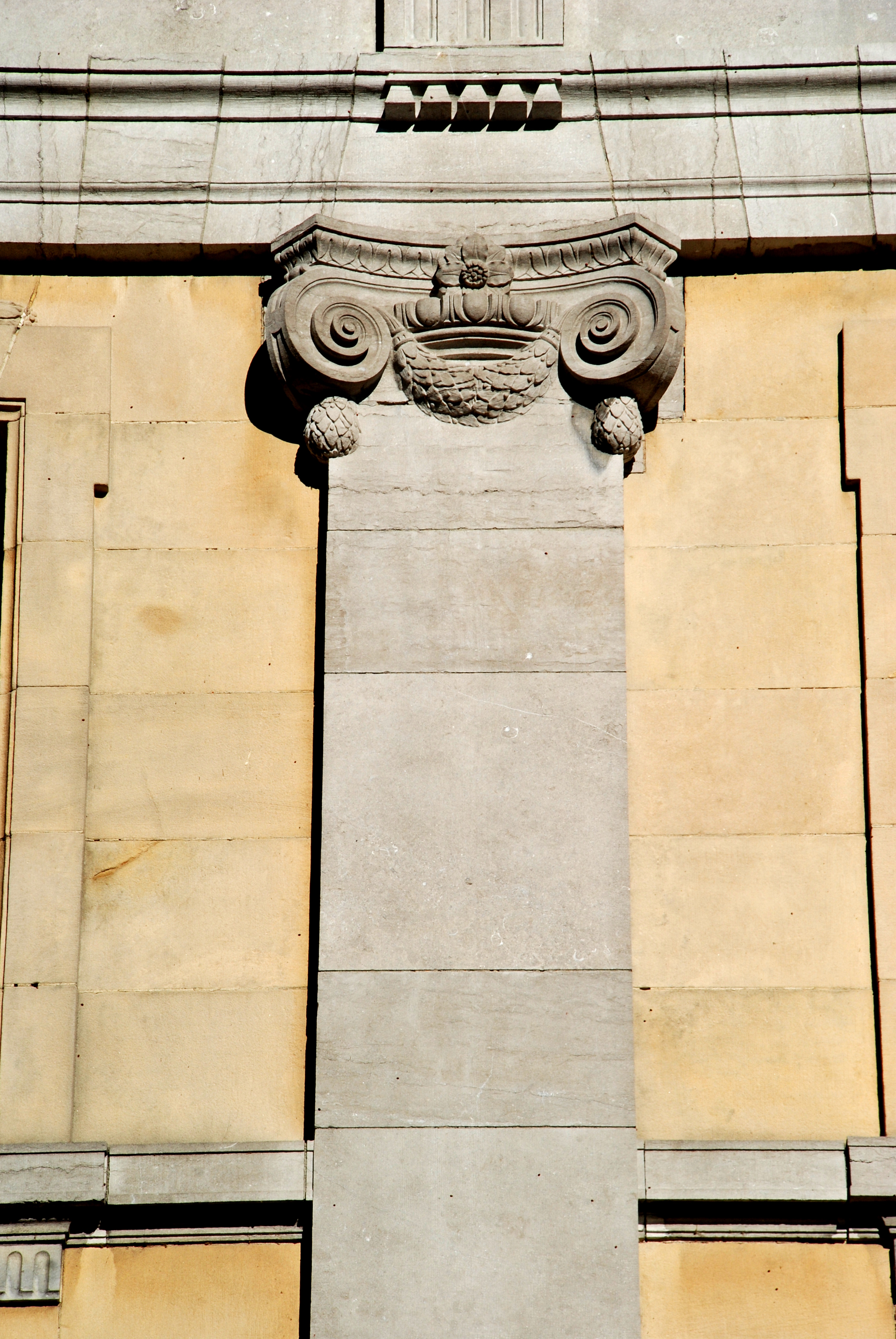
Pilaster of the left side wing

== Sculptures ==
In front of the palace, at the end of the Paleizenlaan, stands an animal sculpture by Charles, Viscount du Passage, entitled After the Fight and representing a roaring deer. This statue, which had stood at this location since 1893, was badly damaged by rust and frost and was replaced by a bronze replica in 2010.

In the back stands the statue of Civilis, a Batavian leader who led a rebellion against the Romans in 69 AD. The original, sculpted by Lodewijk Van Geel in Valenciennes limestone, badly damaged by bad weather and by acts of vandalism, was replaced by a copy in 2013.

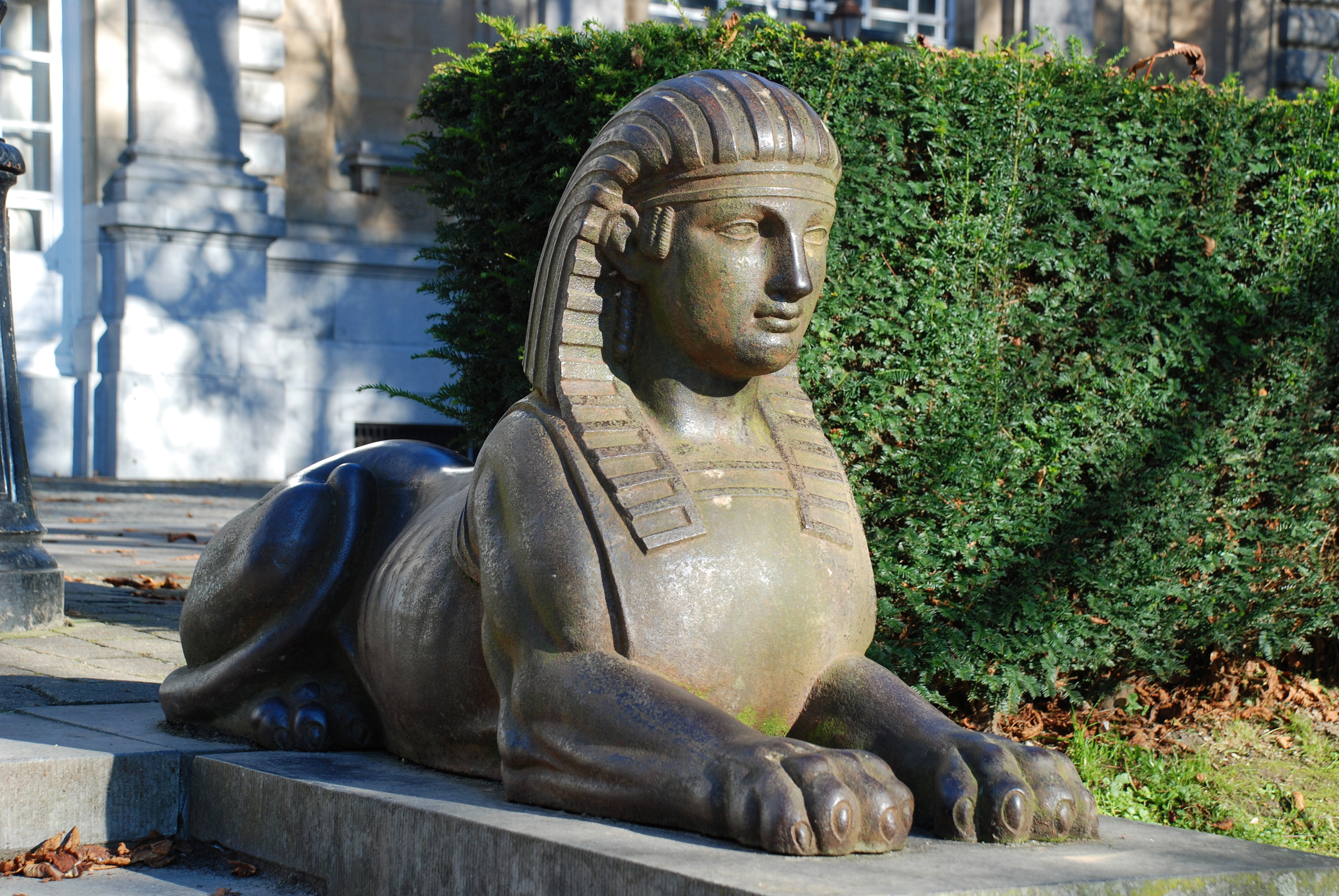
One of the sphinxes lining the staircase

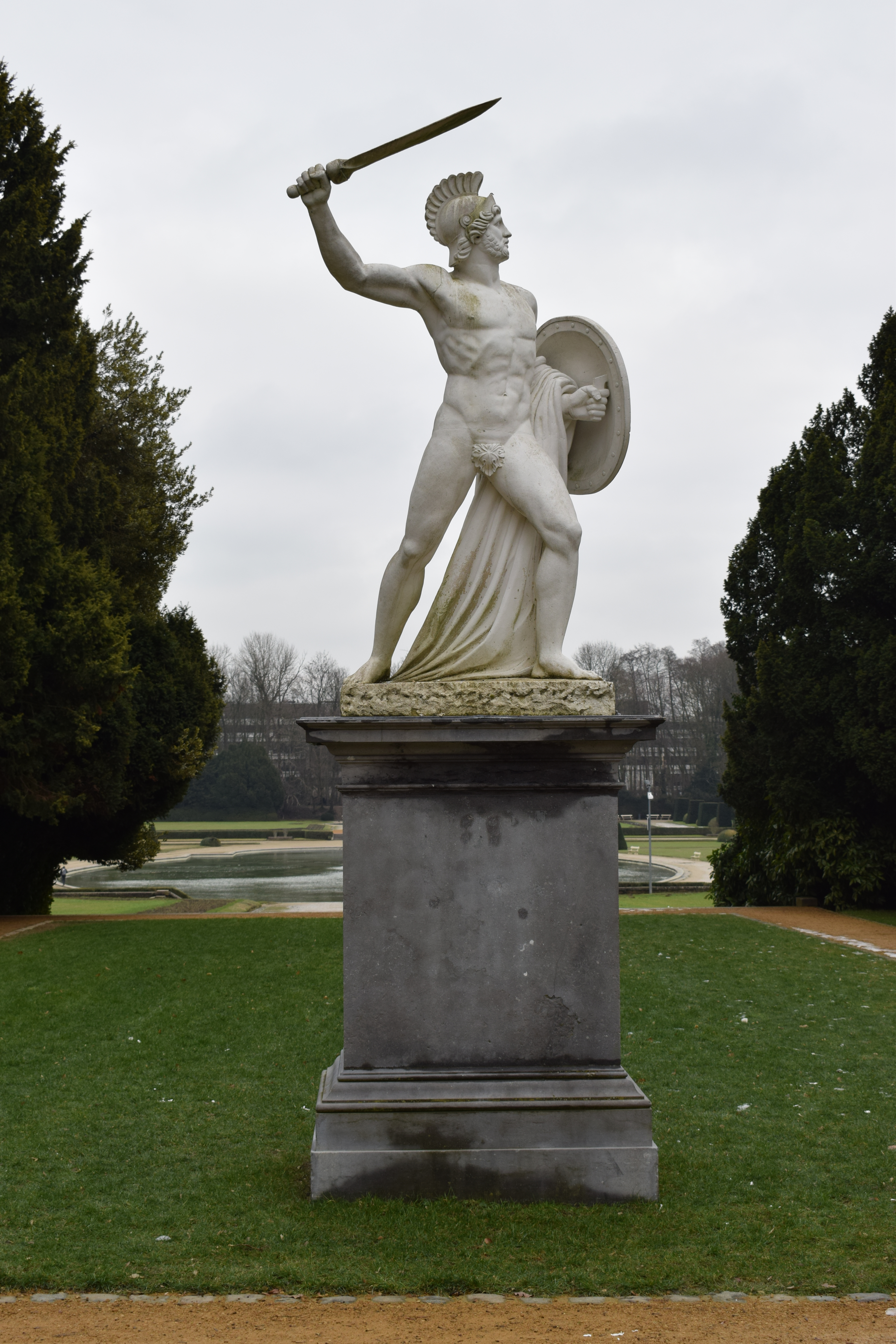
Civilis by Lodewijk Van Geel (1821)

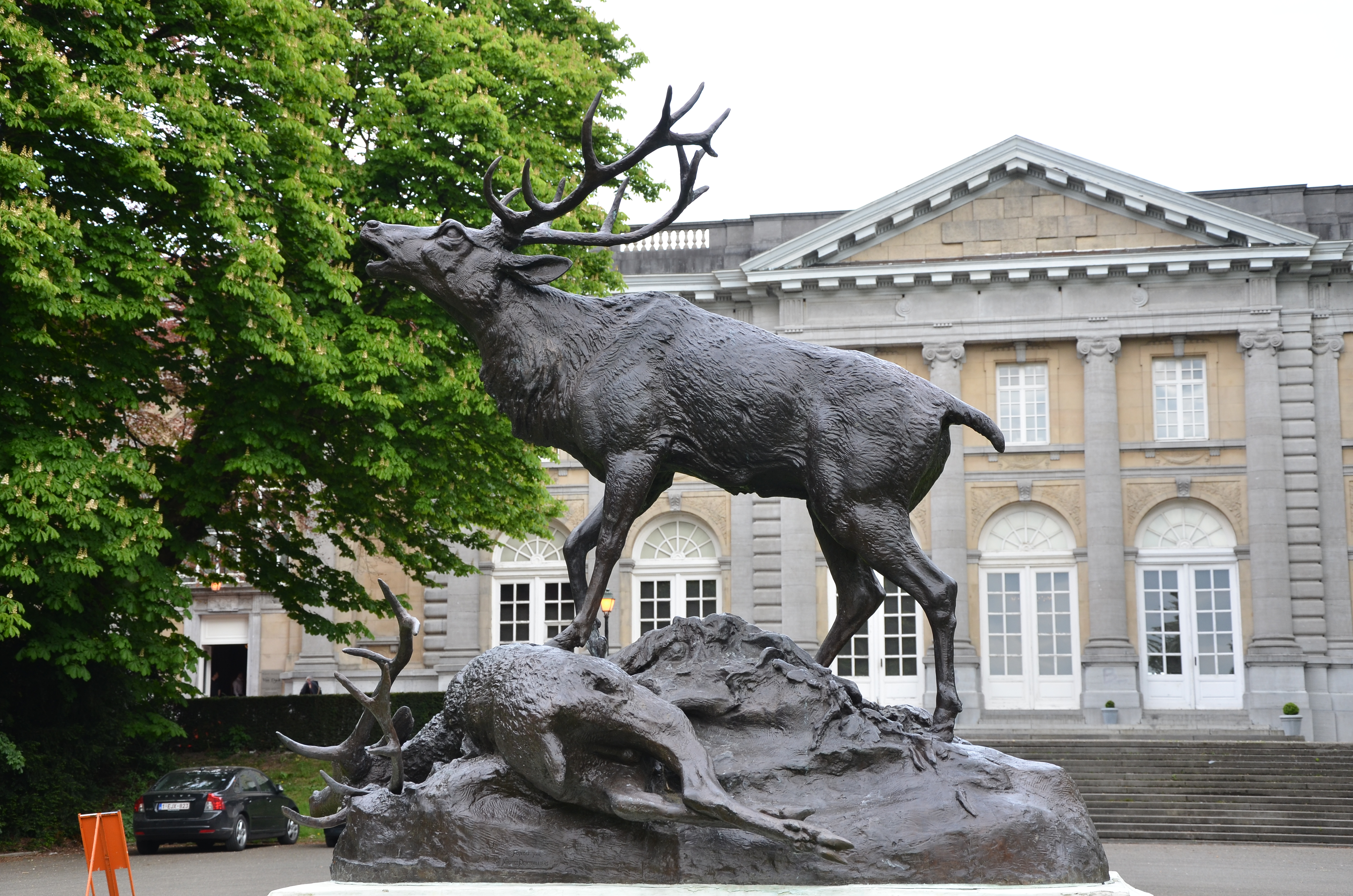
After the Fight by Charles, Viscount du Passage (1893)

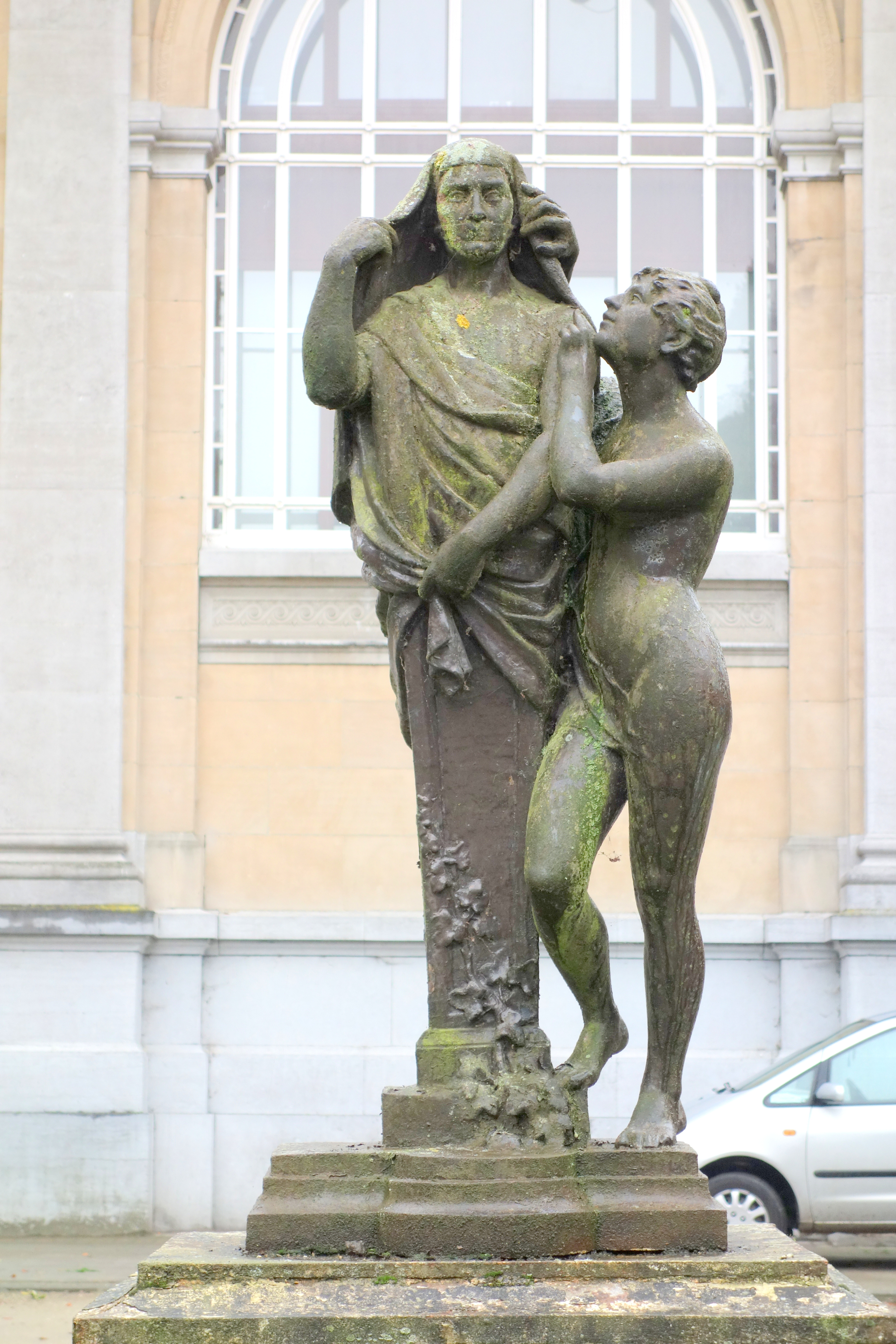
The Surprised Secret by Bernard Adrien Steüer (1897)

== See also ==
- Neoclassical architecture in Belgium
- Belgium in the long nineteenth century
