= Royal Museum for Central Africa =

Museum of ethnography and natural history in Tervuren, Belgium

Royal Museum for Central Africa (RMCA) AfricaMuseum
- Koninklijk Museum voor Midden-Afrika (Dutch); Musée royal de l'Afrique centrale (French); Königliches Museum für Zentralafrika (German)
- Frontal view of the Royal Museum for Central Africa's main building from the gardens
- Interactive fullscreen map
- Former name: Musée du Congo Belge (French); Museum van Belgisch-Kongo (Dutch)
- Established: 1898; 128 years ago
- Location: Tervuren, Flemish Brabant, Belgium
- Coordinates: 50°49′51″N 4°31′07″E
- Type: Ethnography, natural history and history museum
- Director: Bart Ouvry
- Website: www.africamuseum.be/en

The Royal Museum for Central Africa (RMCA) (Dutch: Koninklijk Museum voor Midden-Afrika (KMMA); French: Musée royal de l'Afrique centrale (MRAC); German: Königliches Museum für Zentralafrika (KMZA)), communicating under the name AfricaMuseum since 2018, is an ethnography and natural history museum situated in Tervuren in Flemish Brabant, Belgium, just outside Brussels. It was originally built to showcase King Leopold II's Congo Free State in the International Exposition of 1897.

The museum focuses on the Congo, a former Belgian colony. The sphere of interest, however, especially in biological research, extends to the whole Congo Basin, Central Africa, East Africa, and West Africa, attempting to integrate "Africa" as a whole. Intended originally as a colonial museum, from 1960 onwards it has focused more on ethnography and anthropology. Like most museums, it houses a research department in addition to its public exhibit department. Not all research pertains to Africa (e.g. research on the archaeozoology of Sagalassos, Turkey). Some researchers have strong ties with the Royal Belgian Institute of Natural Sciences.

In November 2013, the museum closed for extensive renovation work, including the construction of new exhibition space, and re-opened in December 2018.

== History ==
=== International Exposition (1897) ===
After the Congo Free State was recognised by the Berlin Conference of 1884–85, King Leopold II wanted to publicise the civilising mission and the economic opportunities available in his private colony to a wider public, both in Belgium and internationally. After considering other places, the king decided to have a temporary exhibition in his royal estate in Tervuren, just east of Brussels, in today's province of Flemish Brabant.

When the 1897 International Exposition was held in Brussels, a colonial section was built in Tervuren, connected to the city centre by the monumental Avenue de Tervueren/Tervurenlaan. The Brussels–Tervuren tram line 44 was built at the same time as the original museum by Leopold II to bring the visitors from the city centre to the colonial exhibition. The colonial section was hosted in the Palace of the Colonies. The building was designed by the French architect Alfred-Philibert Aldrophe and the classical gardens by the French landscape architect Elie Lainé. In the main hall, known as the Hall of the Great Cultures (French: Salon des Grandes Cultures), the architect and decorator Georges Hobé designed a distinctive wooden Art Nouveau structure to evoke a Congolese forest, using Bilinga wood, an African tree. The exhibition displayed ethnographic objects, stuffed animals and Congolese export products (e.g. coffee, cacao and tobacco). In the park, a temporary "human zoo"—a copy of an African village—was built, in which 267 Congolese people lived for the duration of the exhibition. Seven of them died during their forced stay in Belgium.

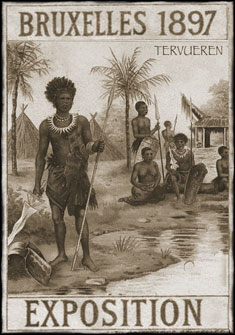
Poster for the colonial section of the 1897 International Exposition

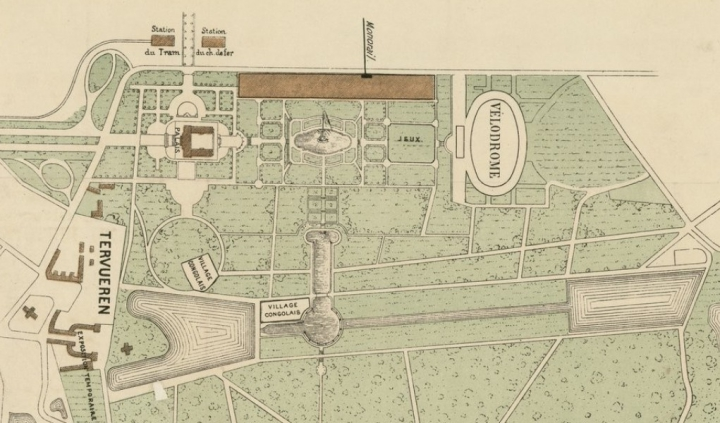
Plan of the colonial section of the 1897 World's Fair in Tervuren

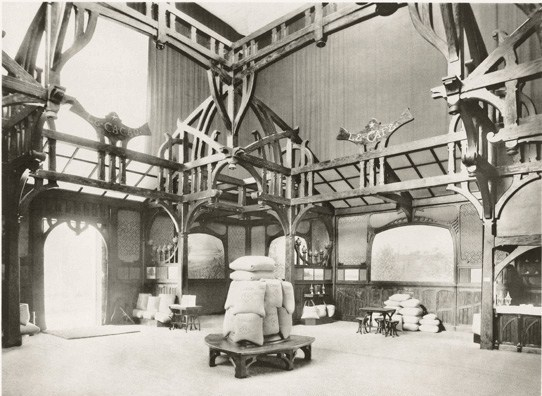
Wooden structure by Georges Hobé in the Hall of the Great Cultures during the exhibition

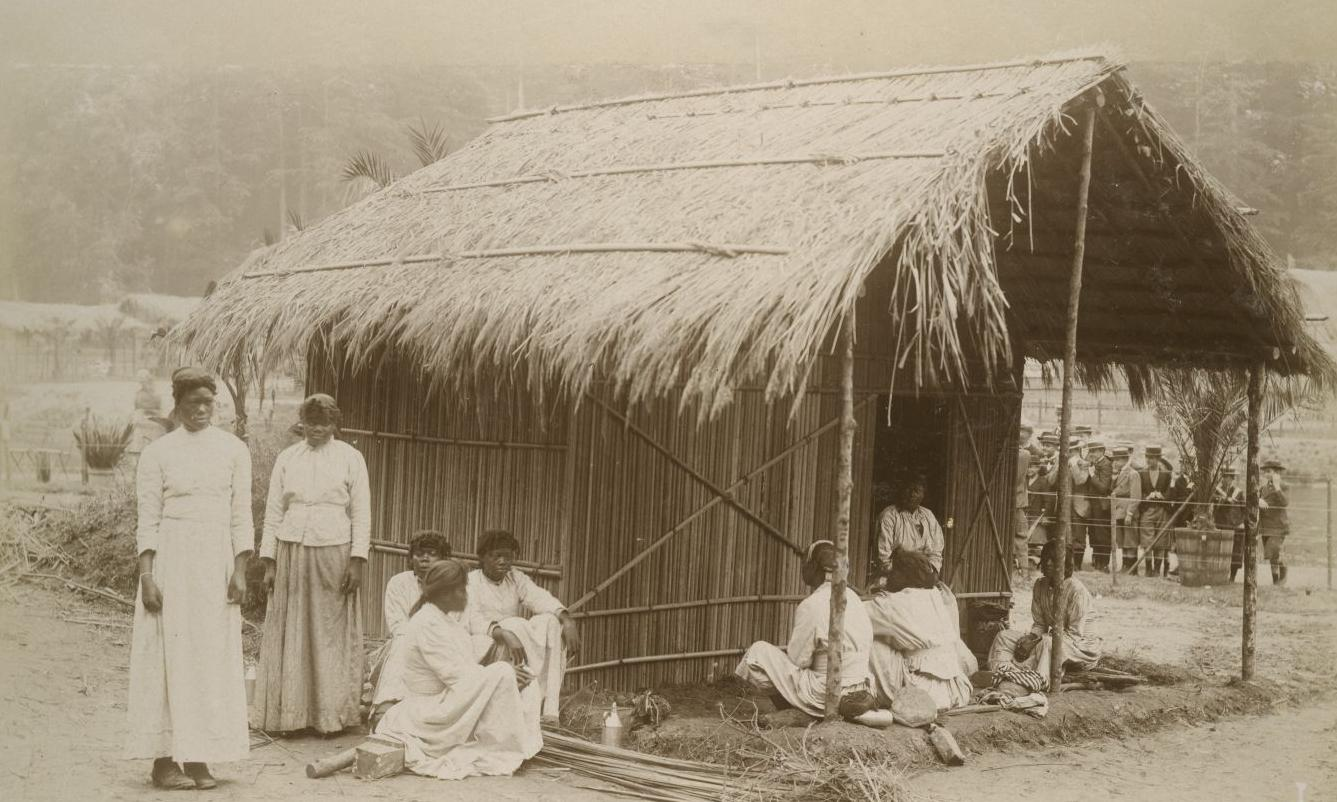
The 'Congolese Village' human zoo during the exhibition

=== Development of the museum ===
The exhibition's success led to the permanent establishment, in 1898, of the Museum of the Congo (French: Musée du Congo, Dutch: Museum van Kongo), a museum and a scientific institution for the dissemination of colonial propaganda and support for Belgium's colonial activities, and a permanent exhibition was installed in the Palace of the Colonies. A decade later, in 1912, a small, similar museum—the African Museum of Namur—was opened in Namur. The museum began to support academic research, but due to the avid collecting of the scientists, the collection soon grew too large for the museum and enlargement was needed. Tervuren, which had become a rich suburb of Brussels, was once again chosen as the location of the enlarged museum. The new museum started construction in 1904 and was designed by the French architect Charles Girault in neoclassical "palace" architecture, reminiscent of the Petit Palais in Paris, with large gardens extending into the Tervuren Forest (a part of the Sonian Forest). It was officially opened in 1910, a year after the death of Leopold II, by his successor, King Albert I, and named the Museum of the Belgian Congo (French: Musée du Congo Belge, Dutch: Museum van Belgisch-Kongo).

The following years saw the consolidation and enlargement of the museum's collections. In 1934, the museum's herbarium was transferred to the National Botanic Garden of Belgium (today's Meise Botanic Garden in Meise, Flemish Brabant). In 1952, the adjective "Royal" was added to the museum's name. In preparation for the 1958 Brussels World's Fair (Expo 58), in 1957, a large building was constructed to accommodate the African personnel working in the exhibition: the Centre d'Accueil du Personnel Africain (CAPA). In 1960, following the independence of the Congo, the museum's name was changed to its current name: the Royal Museum for Central Africa (Dutch: Koninklijk Museum voor Midden-Afrika or KMMA, French: Musée royal de l'Afrique centrale or MRAC, German: Königliches Museum für Zentralafrika or KMZA).

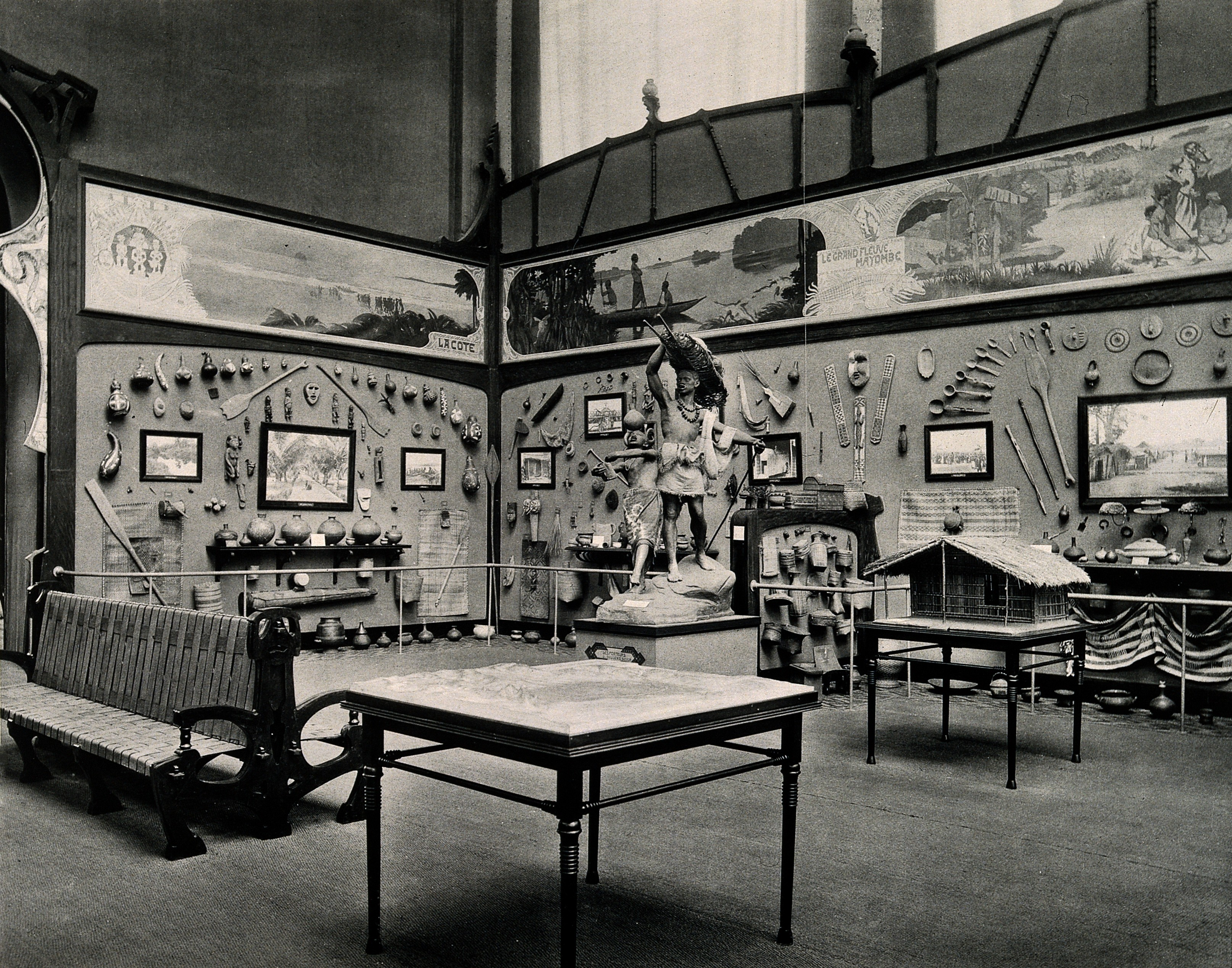
The interior of the original exhibit in the Palace of the Colonies

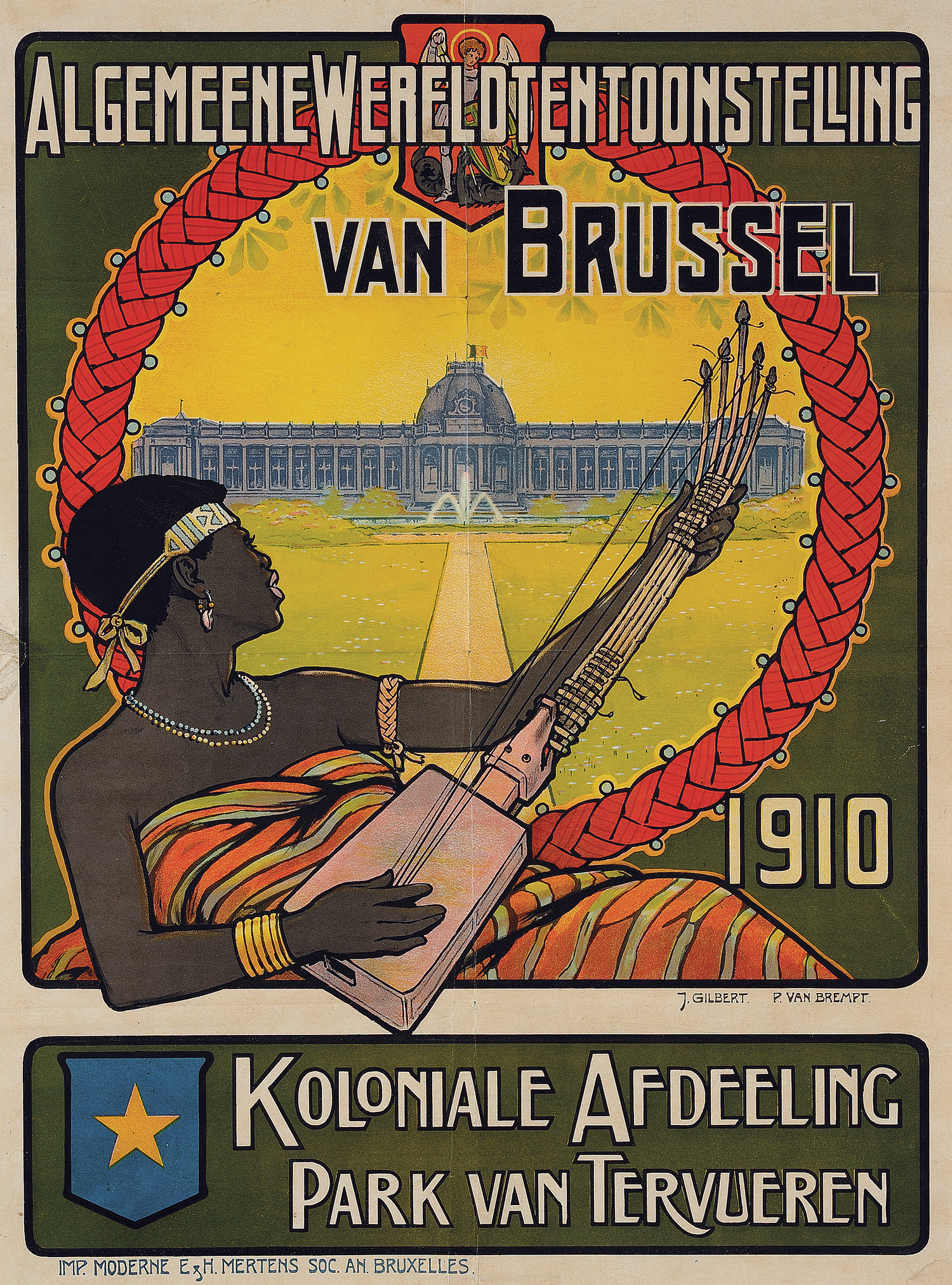
Poster for the colonial section of the Brussels International Exposition of 1910

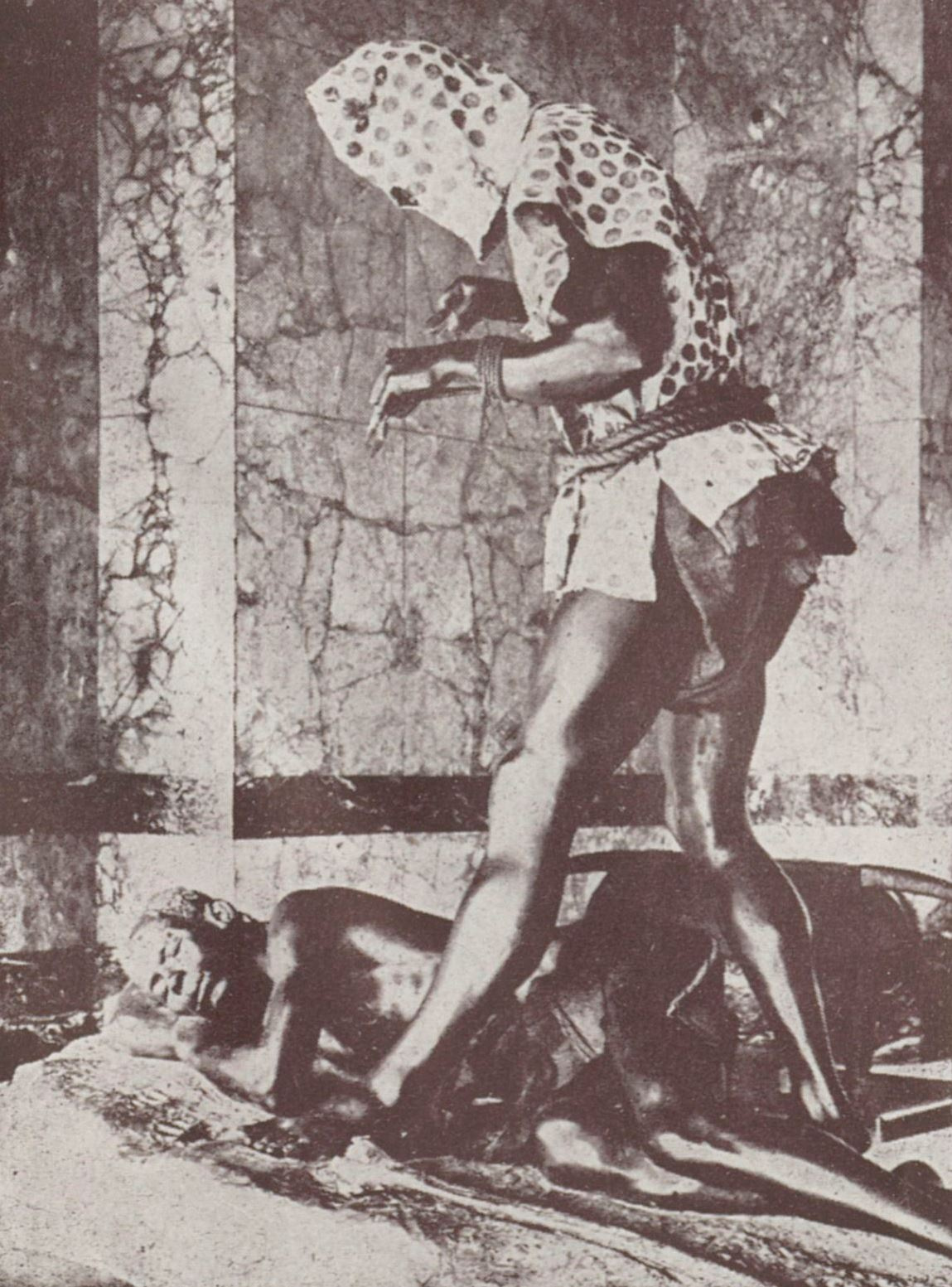
The museum's Leopard Man statue, from Le Monde colonial illustré (1934)

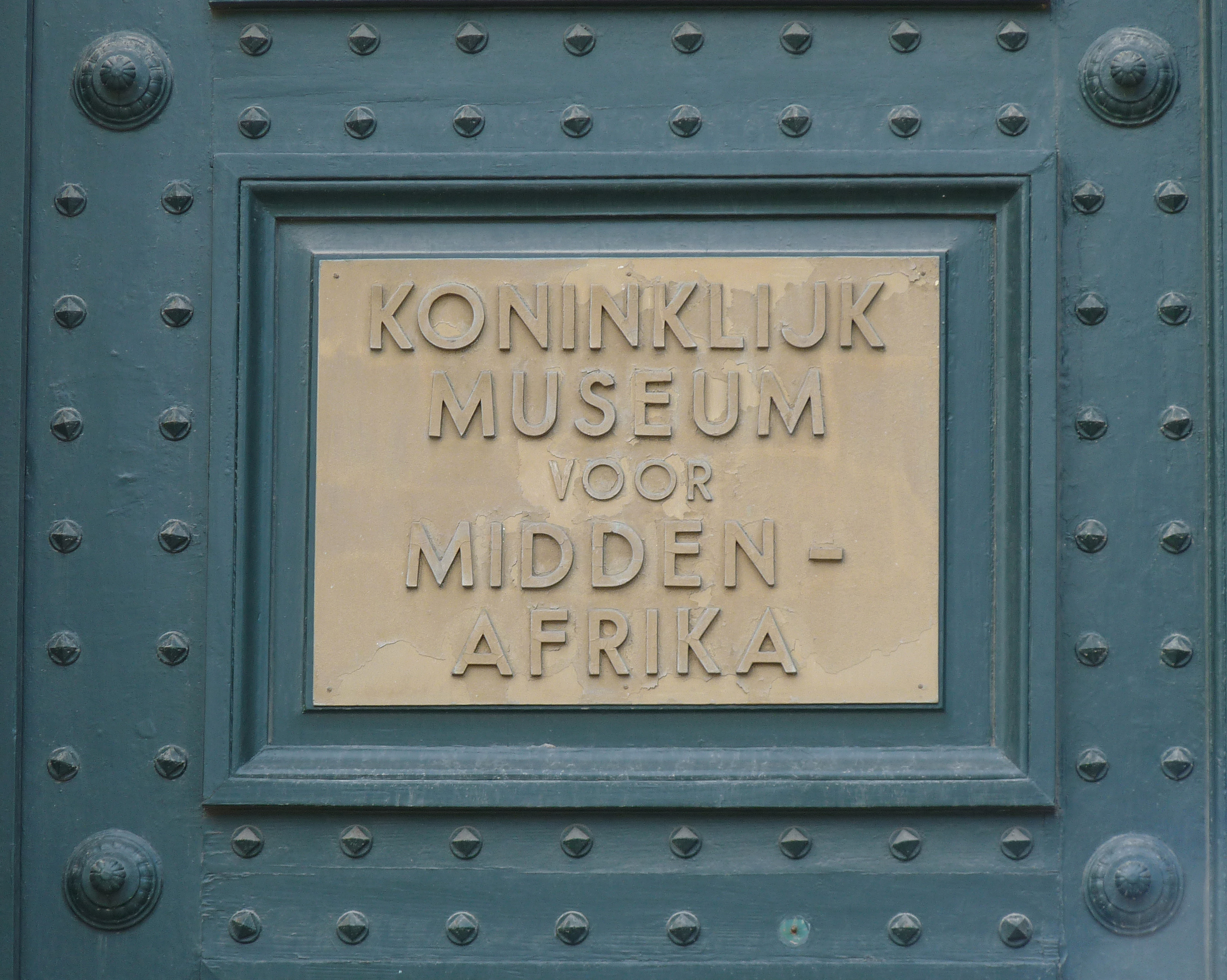
Portal of the Royal Museum for Central Africa (Dutch name shown)

=== Renovation (2013–2018) ===
By the turn of the millennium, the museum was in need of a thorough renovation. The more than 100-year-old central building was no longer adapted to the needs of a current museum operation. Besides, the permanent exhibition was outdated and its presentation not very critical of the colonial history. A new scenography was thus urgently required.

A global master plan was drawn up in 2007 for the entire site. The Belgian Buildings Agency entrusted the plan to the Temporary Association Stéphane Beel Architects (TV SBA). In late 2013, the museum was closed to allow a major renovation of its exhibits and an extension. The Belgian government spent €66 million on the museum's modernisation. The exhibition area was increased from 6,000 m^{2} (65,000 sq ft) to 11,000 m^{2} (120,000 sq ft), while presenting fewer pieces; 700 against 1,400 previously (out of a total of 180,000 objects preserved). The additional space allowed contemporary art from Central Africa to be displayed alongside the original colonial exhibits. Renamed AfricaMuseum, the museum was reopened on 9 December 2018. The statue of King Leopold II that once stood in the Great Rotunda was replaced with a sculpture by DRC-born artist, Aimé Mpane. Some of the colonial statues once displayed in the museum were moved in 2023 to areas where only guided tours visit.

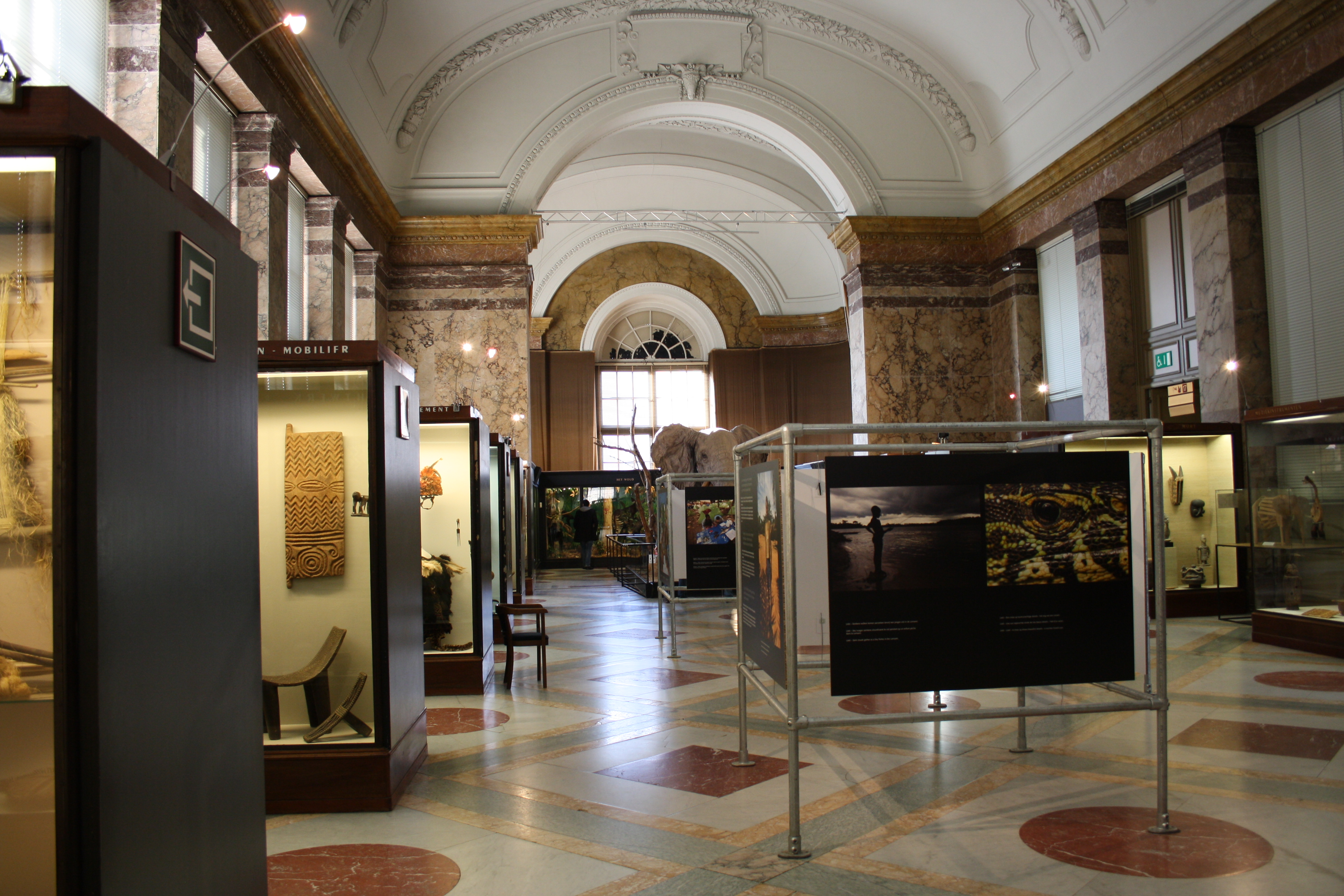
The interior of the museum in 2011, shortly before its major renovation

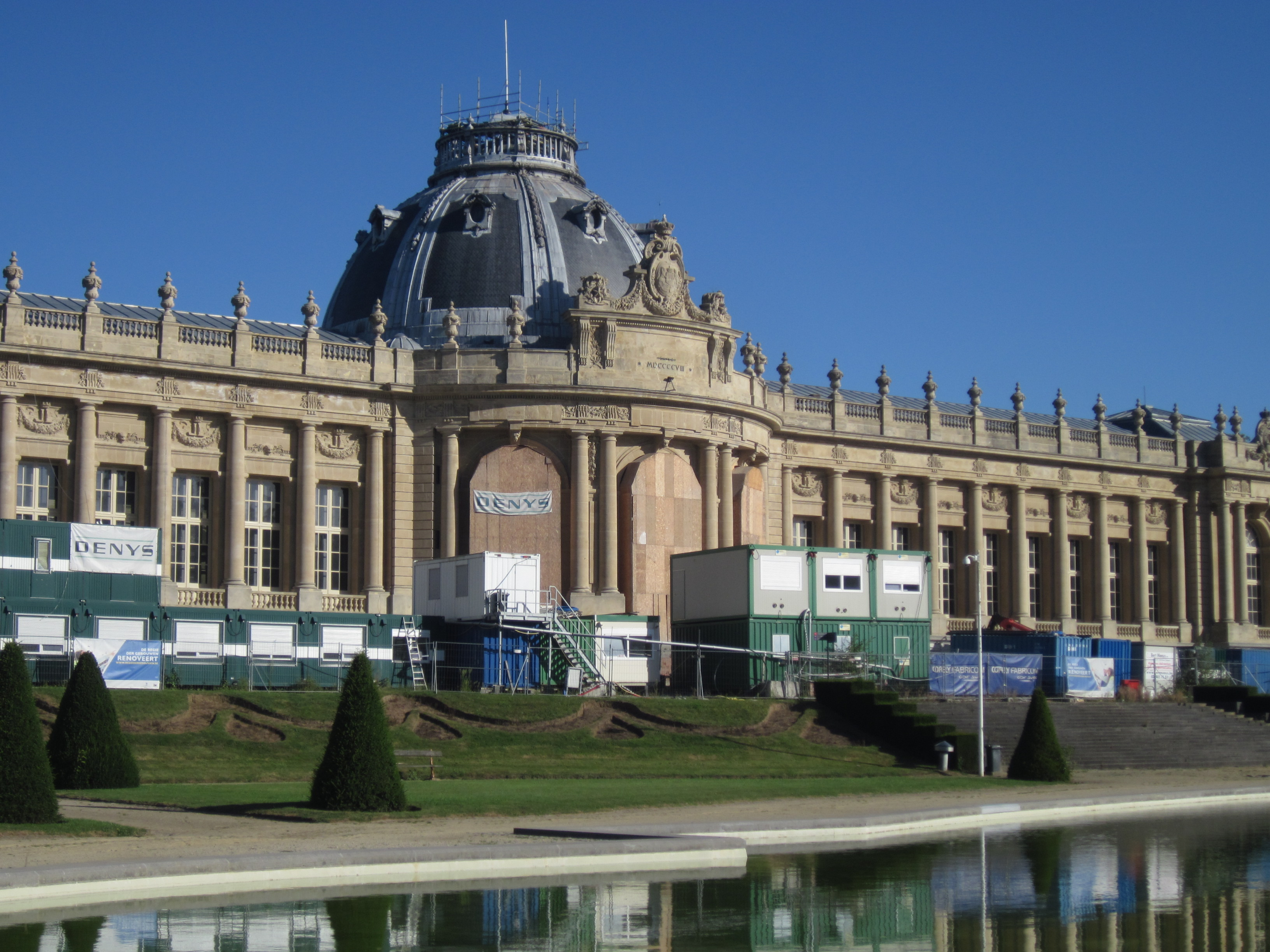
The museum's main building during the 2013–2018 renovation

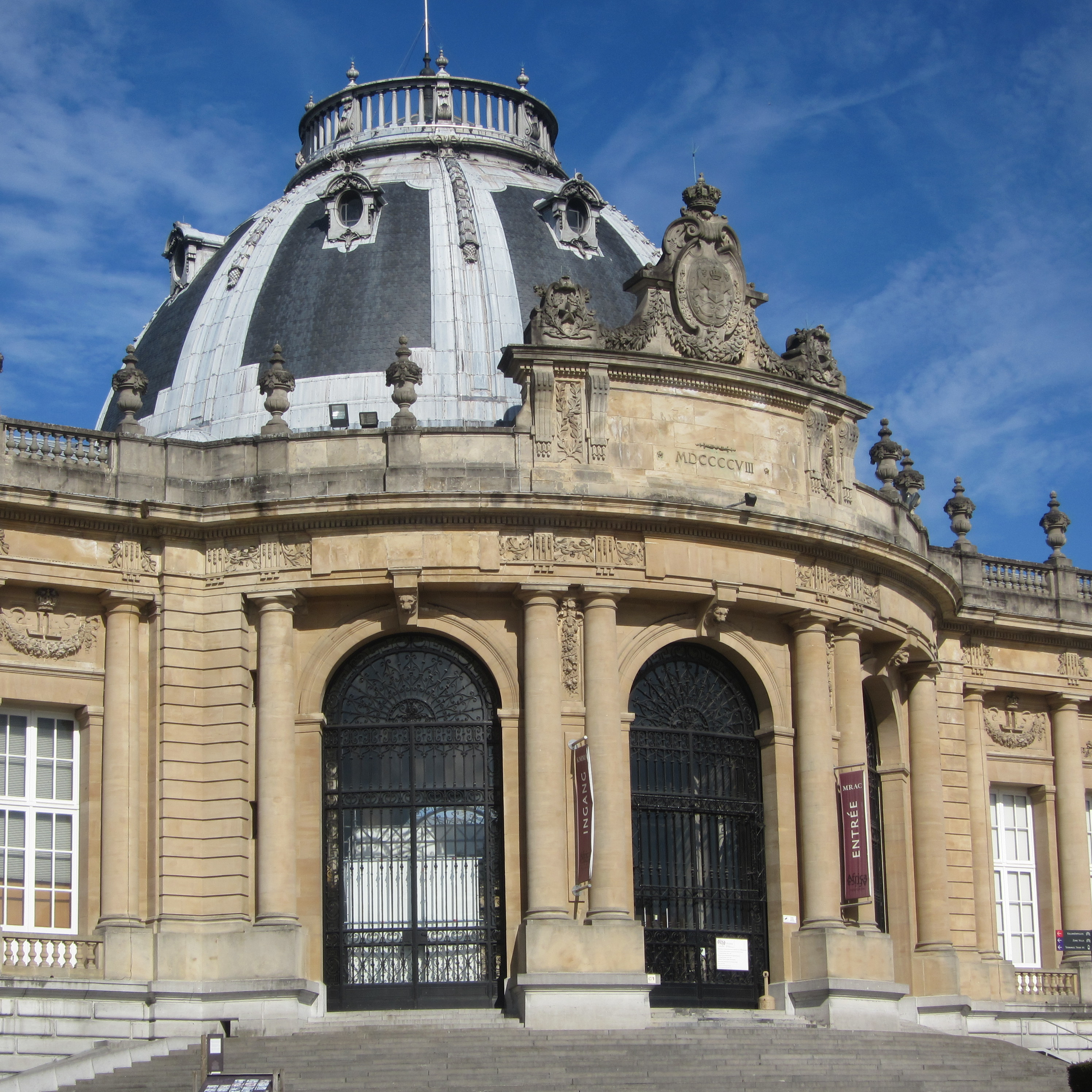
Old museum entrance through the garden with the restored dome

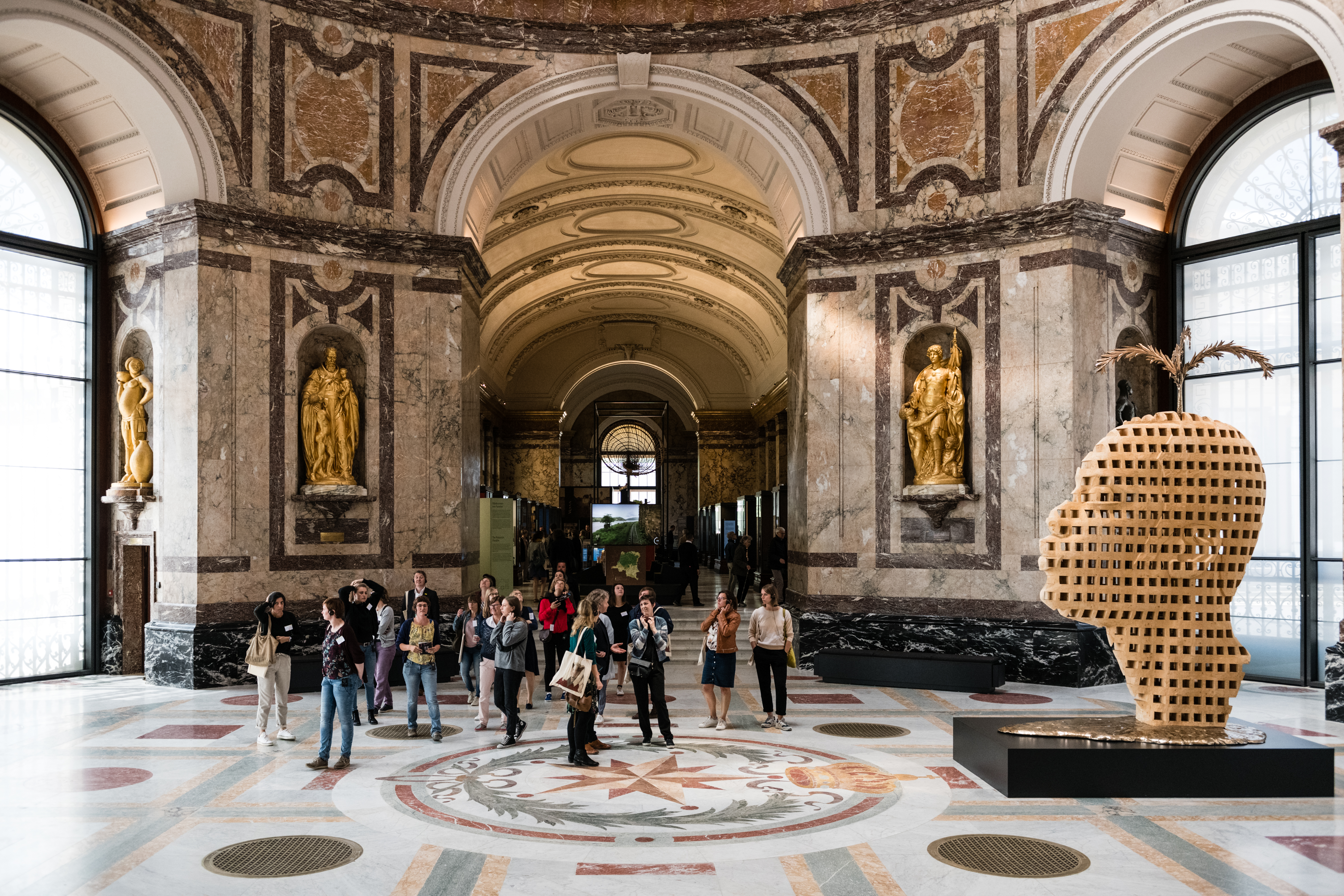
The Great Rotunda in 2019, featuring the artwork New Breath, or the Burgeoning Congo by Aimé Mpane

== Buildings ==
The current AfricaMuseum complex consists of six buildings. The centrally located main building houses the permanent exhibitions. It was built under Leopold II by the French architect Charles Girault. The building is 125 metres (410 ft) long and 75 metres (246 ft) wide. The façade is decorated in the style of the neoclassical French grand palaces. On the right (south-west) side of this imposing building is the Executive Pavilion, and on the left (north-east), the Stanley Pavilion, which houses the entire Stanley Archive. The former Palace of the Colonies (now the Africa Palace) has been transformed into a reception centre, media library and banquet hall. The Centre d'Accueil du Personnel Africain (CAPA) building, erected in 1957 for the African staff, houses several scientific departments.

Following the museum's complete renovation, a part of the previously scattered archives are now presented in new on-site exhibition spaces. A reception pavilion, newly built in 2016, between the management building and the Palace of Africa, functions as the entrance building. In this building are the ticket offices, cloakrooms, a shop, a restaurant, as well as a picnic area for children. An underground gallery leads from the reception building into the existing museum building. This space is also used for temporary exhibitions. In the museum's enclosed courtyard, a sunken garden with a light shaft was added, bringing light to this underground level.

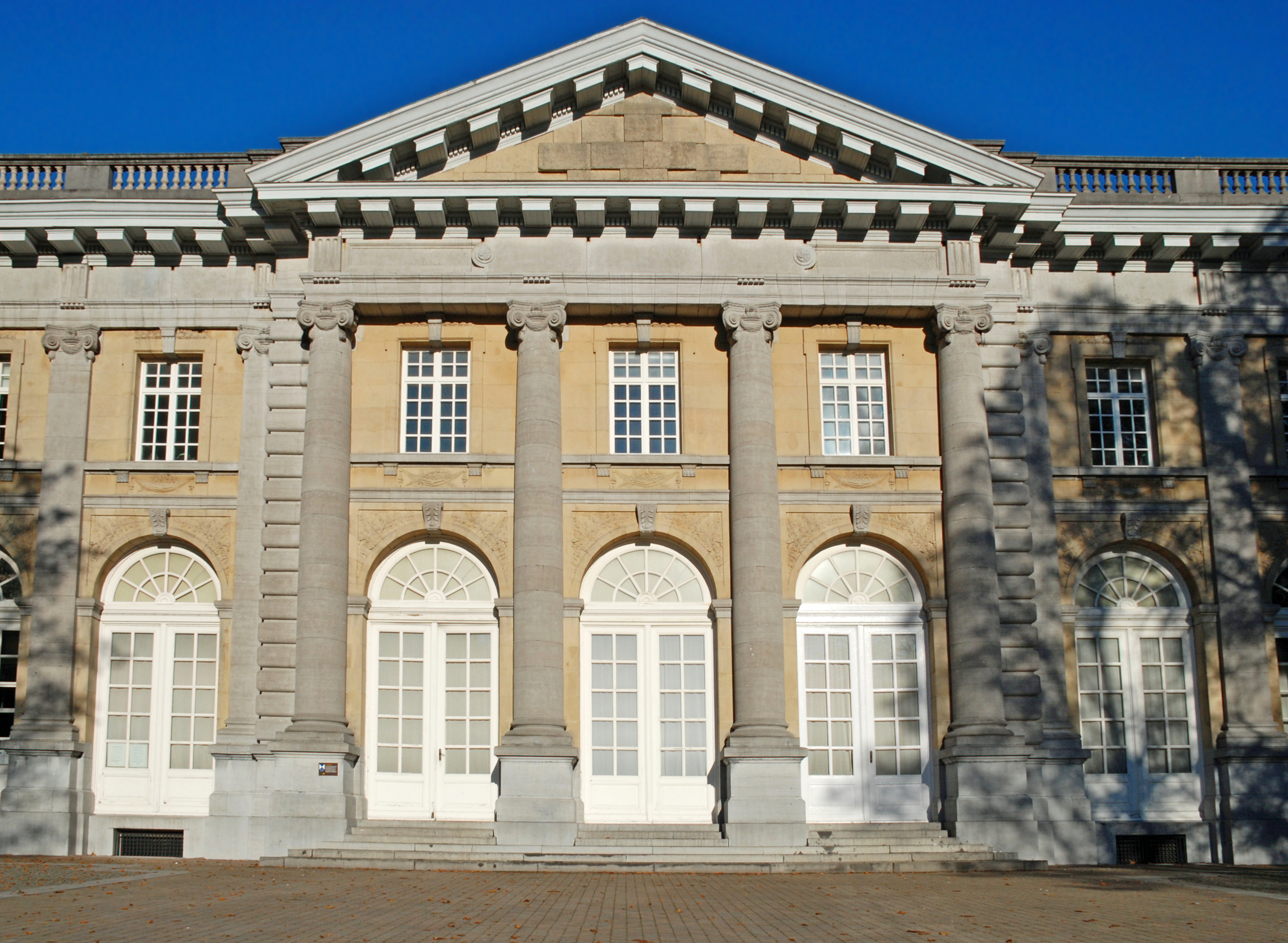
Africa Palace (former Palace of the Colonies) (Aldrophe, 1897)

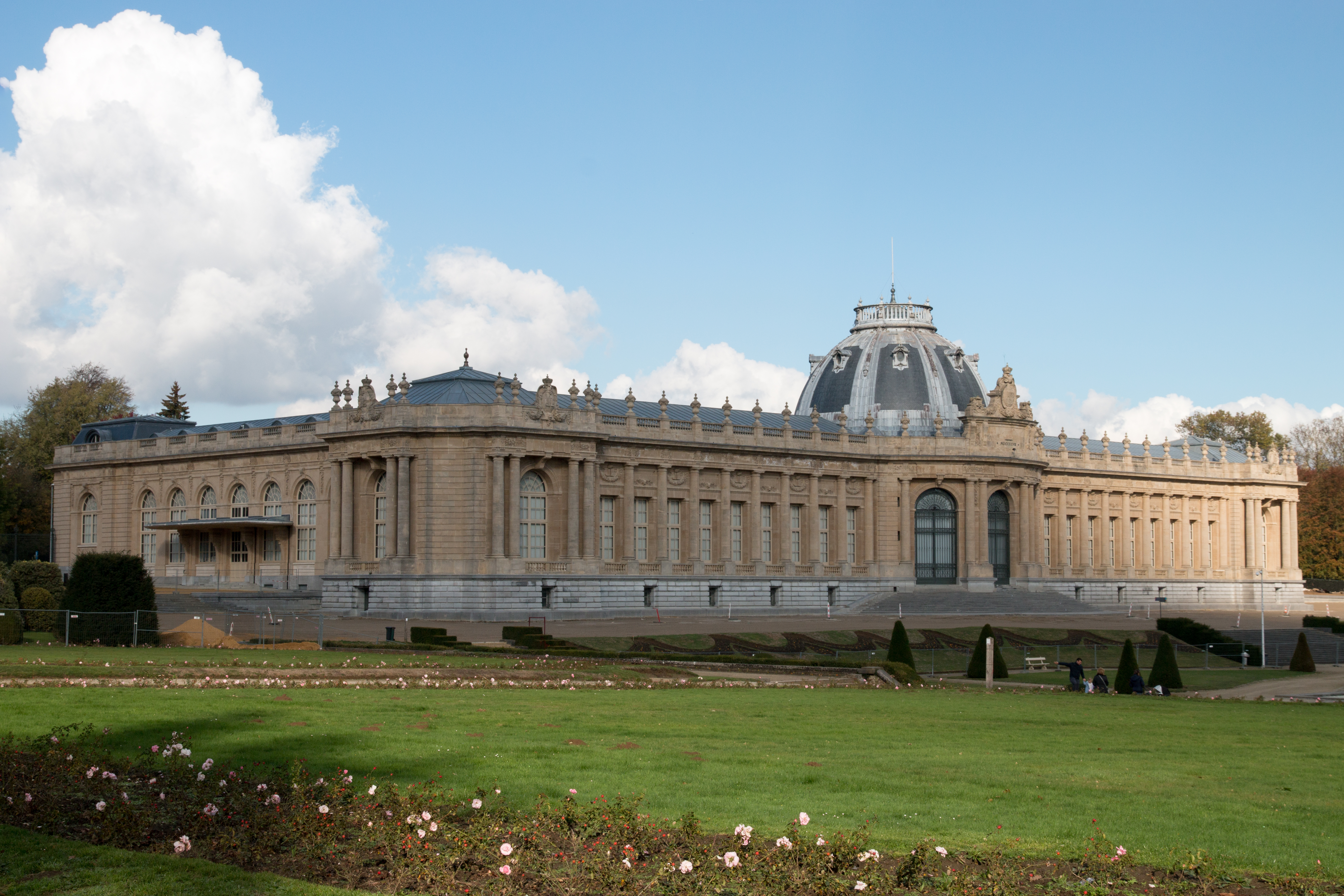
Main museum building (Girault, 1905–1910)

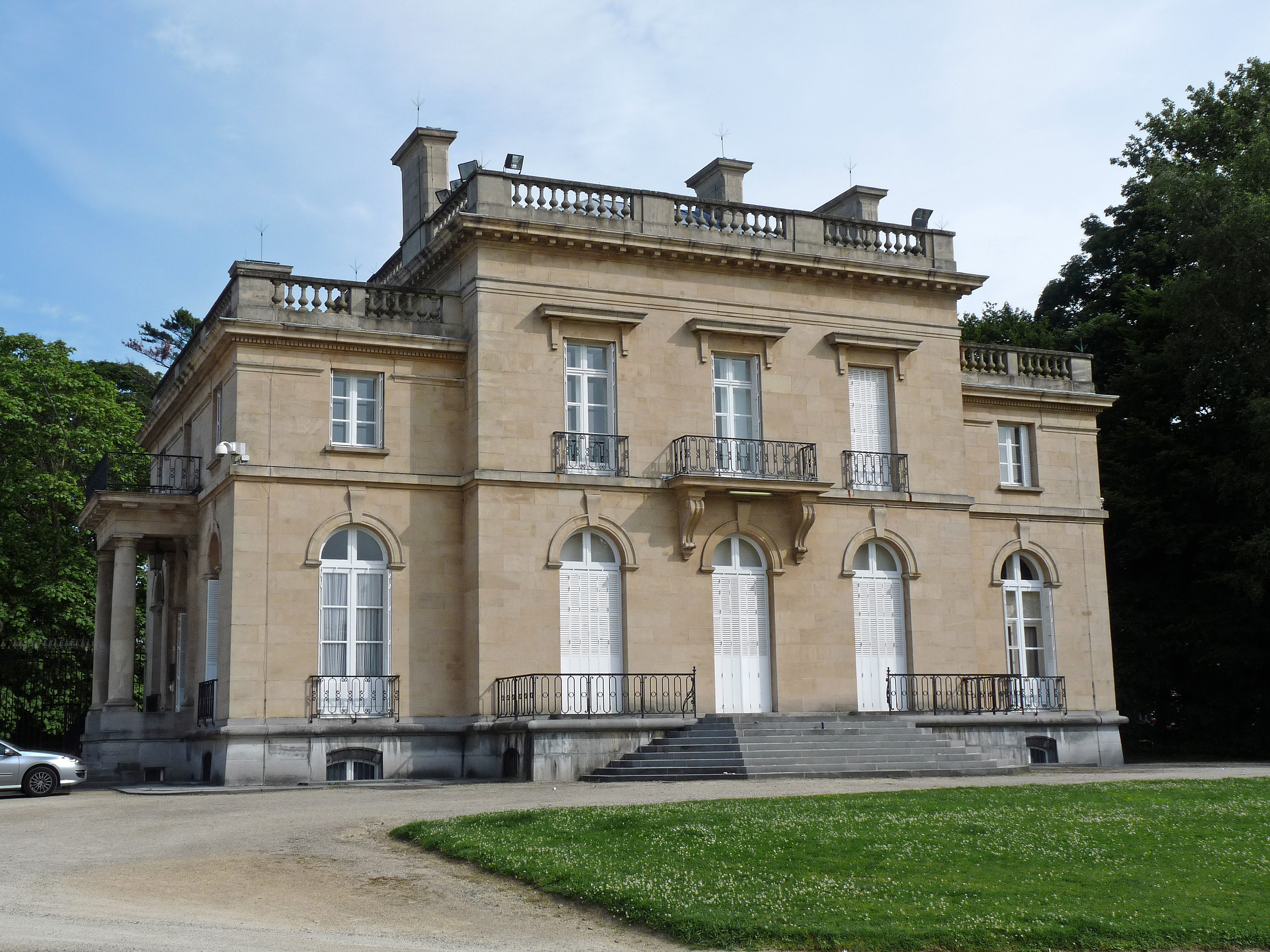
Stanley Pavilion

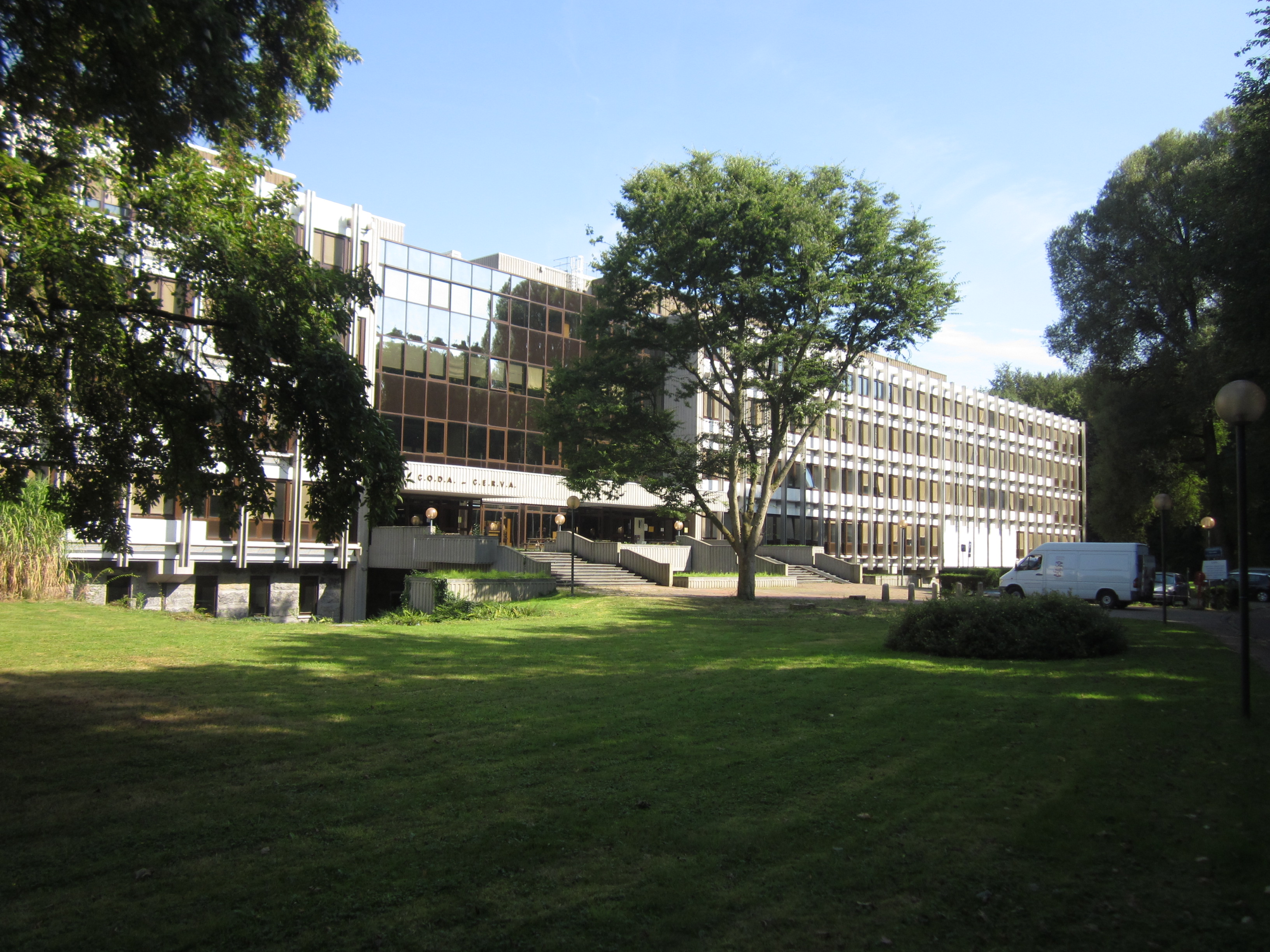
Centre d'Accueil du Personnel Africain (CAPA) building (1957)

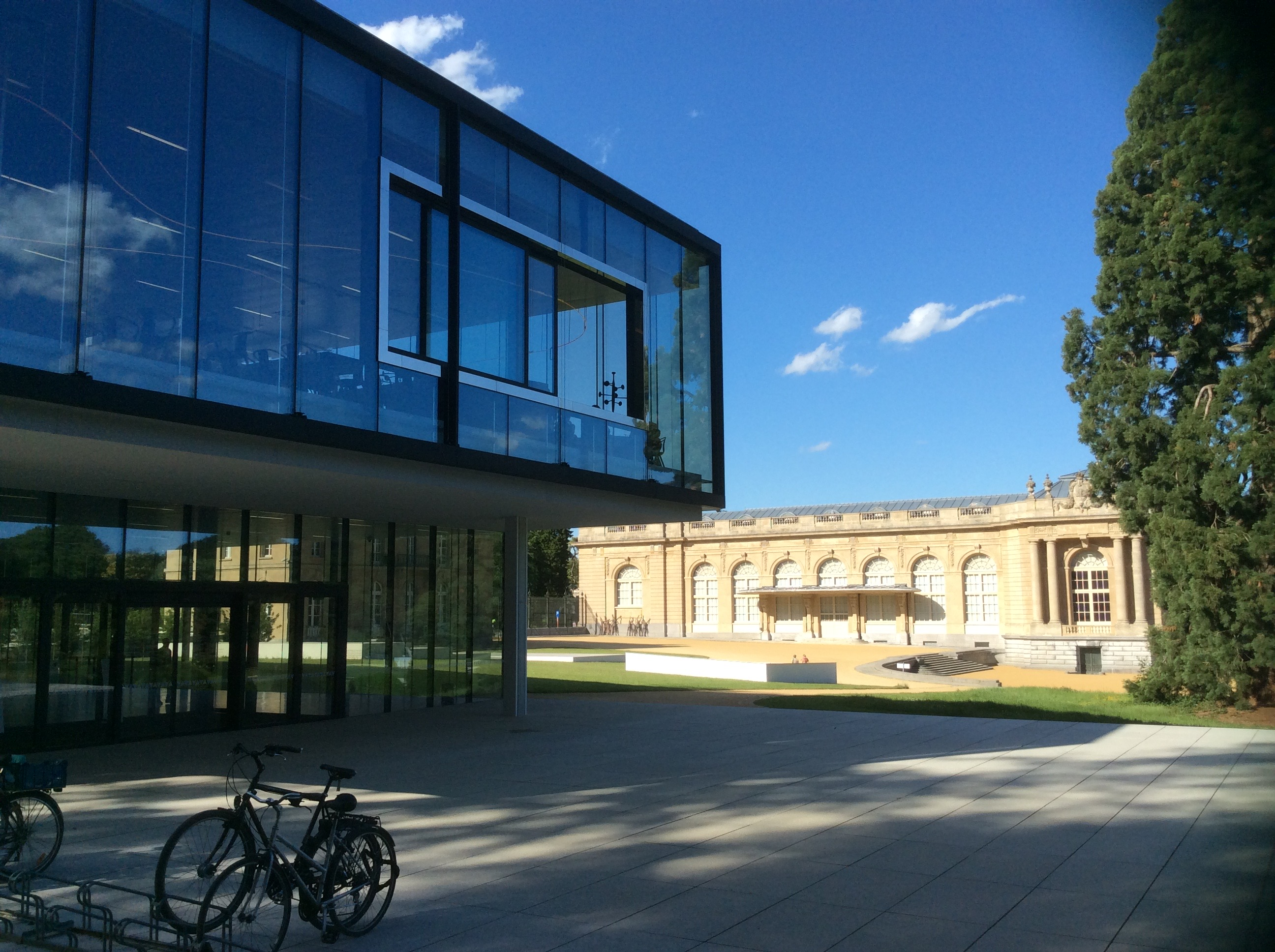
New entrance pavilion (2018)

== Collections ==
The AfricaMuseum houses collections that are unique in the world, of which only a small proportion can be exhibited. According to the museum's website, the objects and animals on display in the main building make up less than 5% of the total museum's collection:

- The Department of Zoology has over 10,000,000 specimens, including 6,000,000 insects and 1,000,000 fish.
- The Department of Geology and Mineralogy holds more than 56,000 wood samples in its xylotheque, as well as 200,000 rock samples and 17,000 minerals.
- The Department of Cultural Anthropology can boast of 120,000 ethnographic objects (1,600 of which are in the exhibition rooms). The ethnomusicology collection comprises 8,000 musical instruments, as well as 2,500 hours of recordings of traditional music from sub-Saharan Africa, in particular in Central Africa (Congo, Rwanda and Burundi), of which the oldest dates back to 1910 (wax Edison scrolls). Additionally, more than 500,000 films and photos are kept in the film and photo libraries.
- Finally, the Department of History and General Scientific Services manages thousands of historical objects and 350 archives, including some of Henry Morton Stanley's journals. Some of the collections are digitally accessible.

The herbarium collection of the then-Congo Museum was transferred to that of the National Botanic Garden of Belgium in 1934.

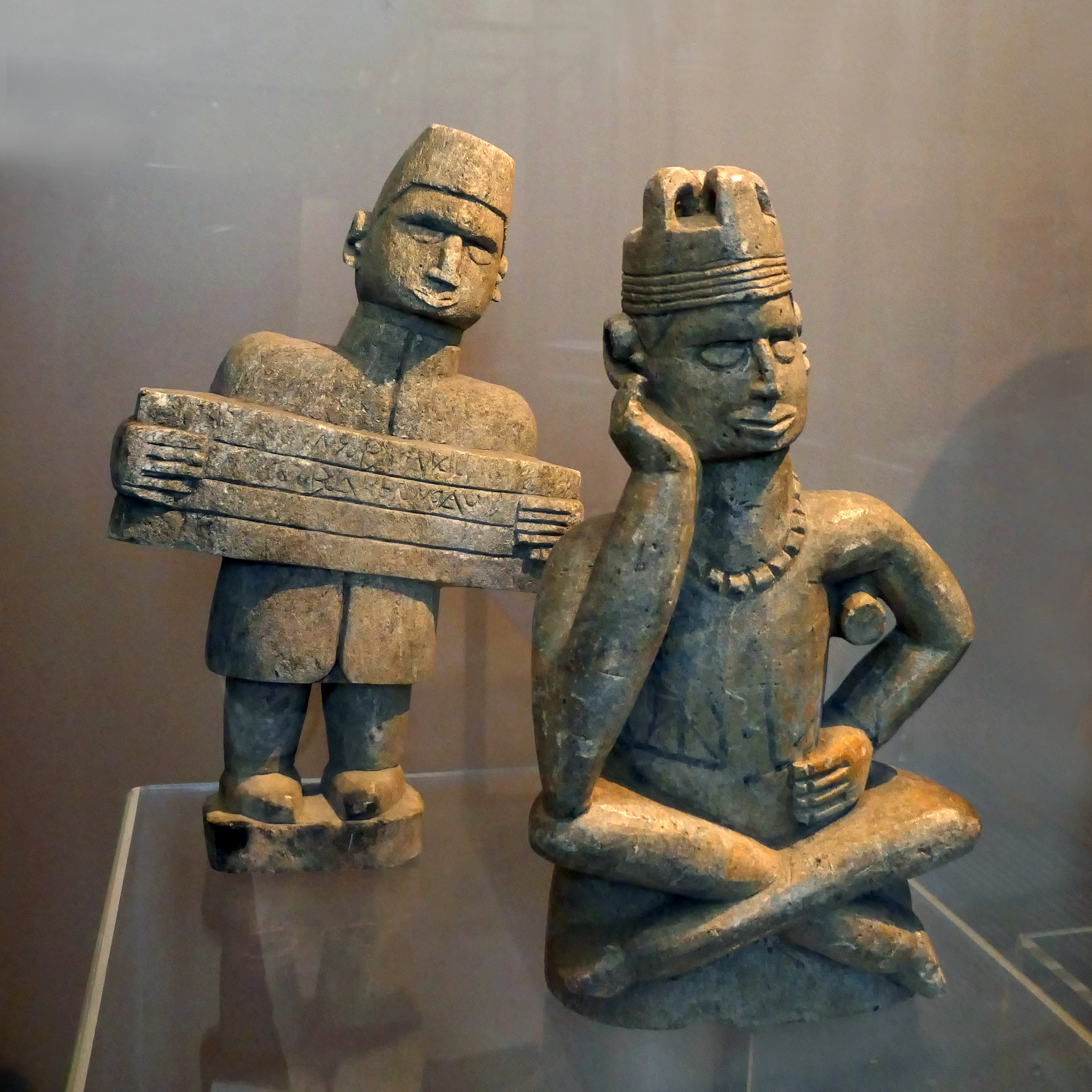
Ntadi (Mintadi) funerary statues, Mboma culture, northern Angola (left) and central Congo (right), late 19th century

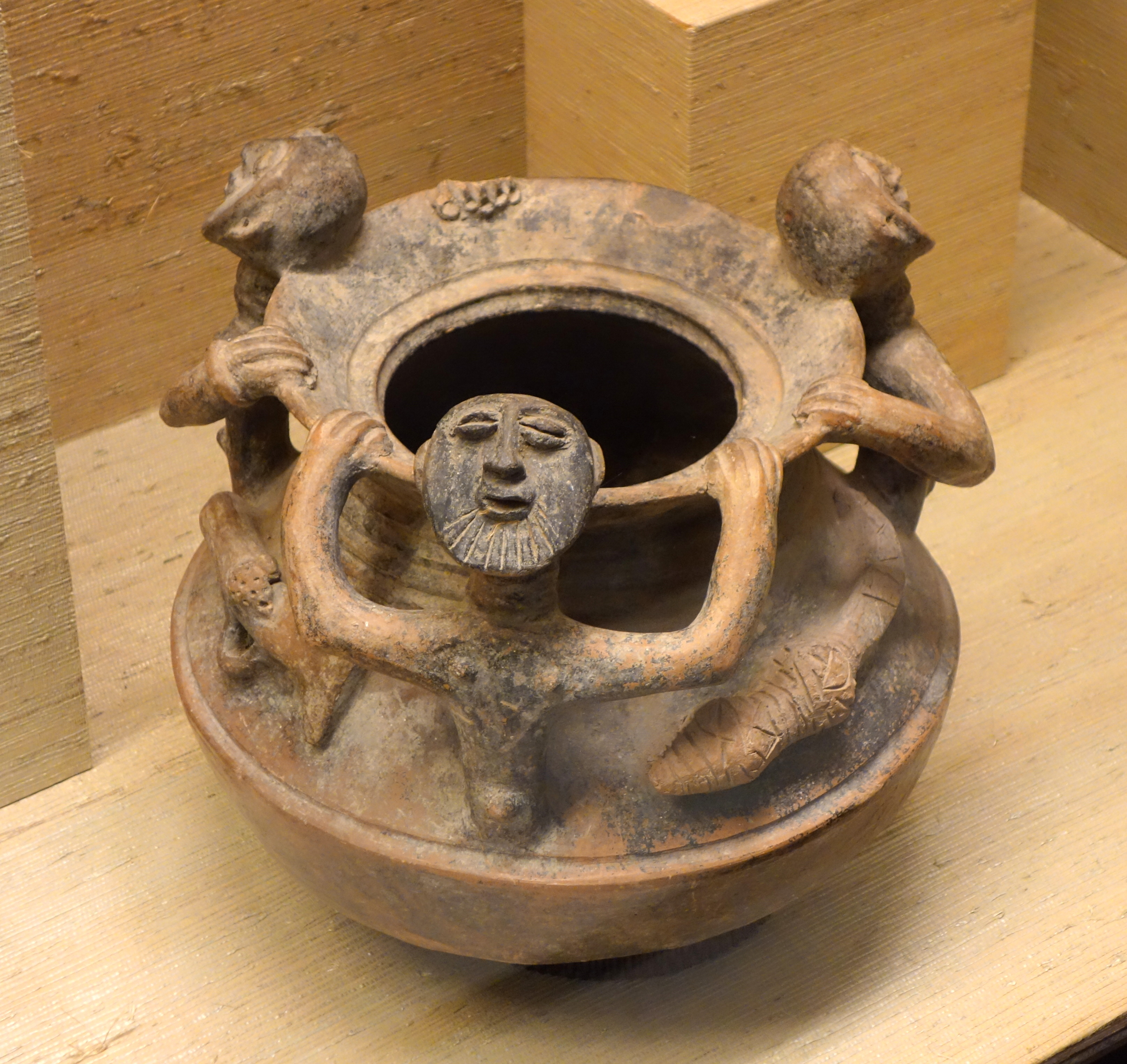
Terracotta receptacle for funeral donations from the tomb of King Prempeh I, Ashanti culture, Ghana

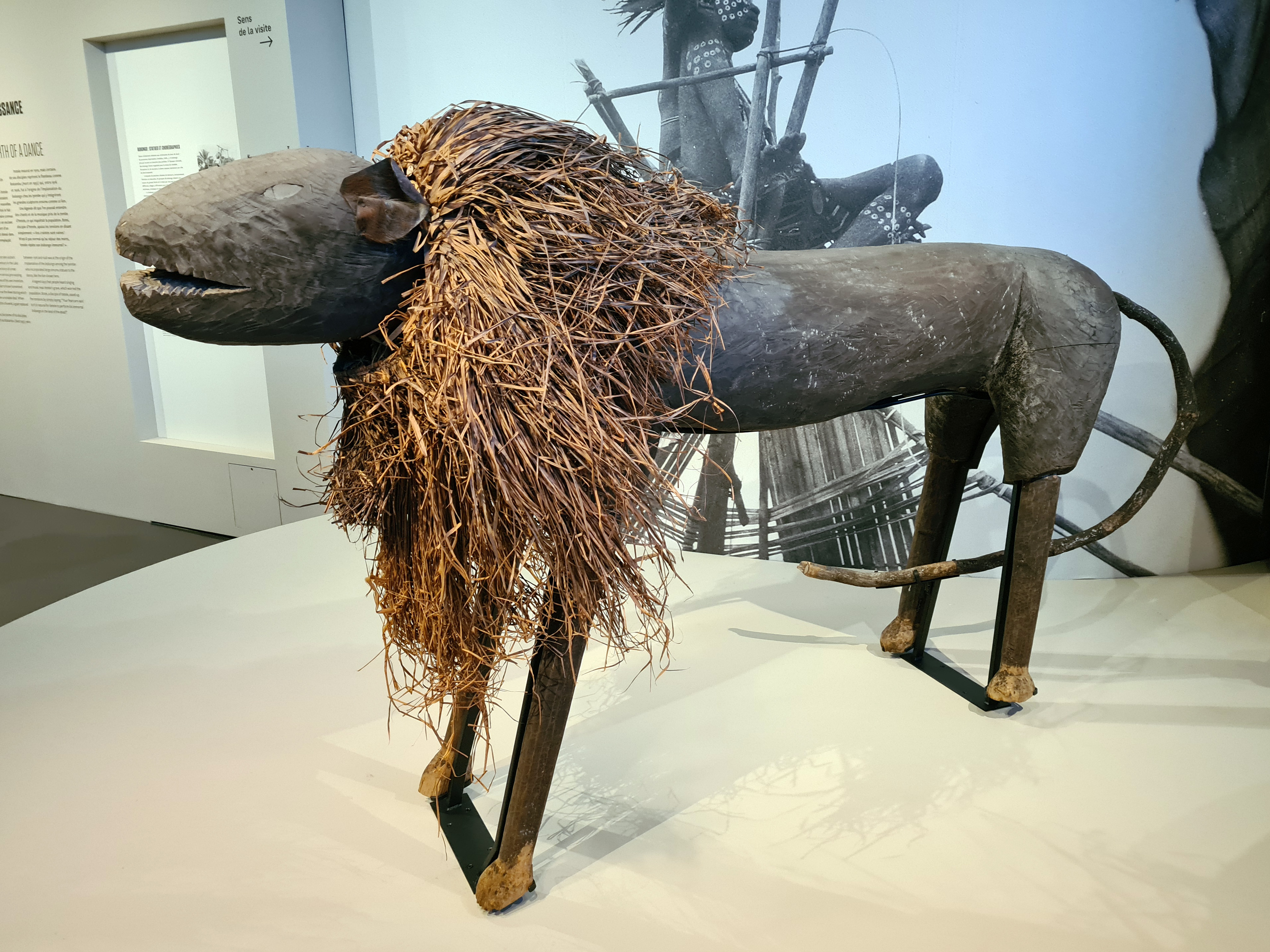
Emumu statue representing a lion, made of wood and plant fibres, Lyembe culture, western Congo, c. 1951

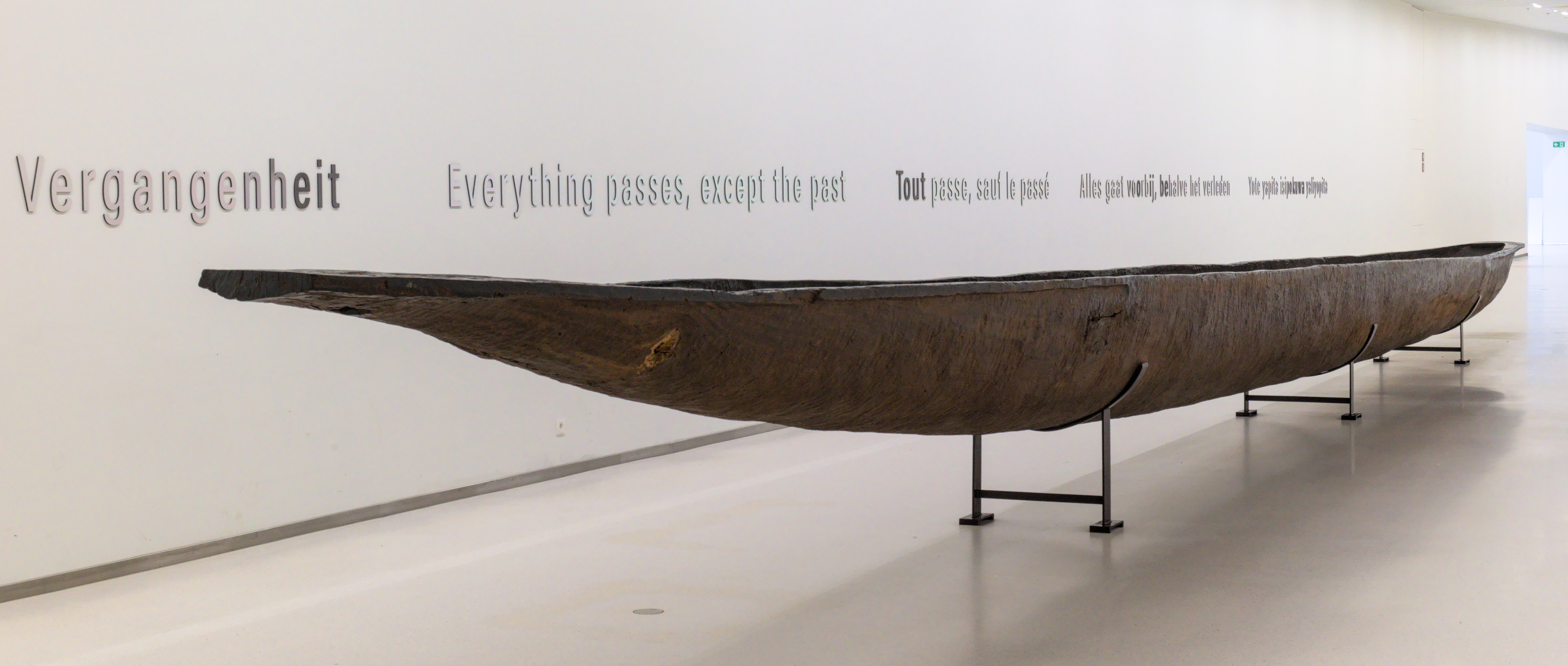
Long dugout canoe used by King Leopold III in the Congo and offered by the inhabitants of Ubundu. Installed in the entrance of the renovated museum.

== Archives ==
The museum stores archives documenting its own institutional history, as well as archives of private businesses, organisations, and individuals. As of 2018, online finding aids exist for archives of Lieutenant-General Alphonse Cabra, musicologist Paul Collaer, geologist Jules Cornet, Commandant Francis Dhanis, Governor-General of the Belgian Congo Félix Fuchs, Lieutenant-General Cyriaque Gillain, General-Major Josué Henry de la Lindi, explorer Charles Lemaire, American explorer Richard Mohun, Colonel Emmanuel Muller, German explorer Paul Reichard, Captain Albert Sillye, British explorer Henry Morton Stanley, soldier and explorer Émile Storms, Vice-Governor General of the Congo Free State Alphonse van Gèle, historian Jan Vansina, territorial administrator Auguste Verbeken, historian Benoît Verhaegen, Commandant Gustave Vervloet, as well as the railway enterprises Compagnie du chemin de fer du bas-Congo au Katanga (BCK) and Groupe Empain.

In March 2026, the AfricaMuseum was reported to be in a dispute with a U.S. mining company backed by Jeff Bezos and Bill Gates over the digitisation of colonial-era geological archives from the Democratic Republic of the Congo.

== Research ==
The publicly accessible exhibitions only represent about 25% of the museum's activities. The scientific departments, which represent the bulk of the museum's academic and research facilities, together with the main collections, are housed in the Africa Palace, the Stanley Pavilion and in the CAPA building.

There are four departments:

- Department of Cultural Anthropology
  - Ethnography
  - Archaeology and prehistory
  - Linguistics and ethnomusicology
  - Anthropology and ethnohistory
- Department of Geology and Mineralogy
  - General geology
  - Mineralogy and petrography
  - Cartography and photo interpretation
  - Physical and mineral chemistry
- Department of Zoology
  - Vertebrates (ornithology, ichthyology, herpetology, osteology and mammalogy)
  - Entomology
  - Invertebrates non-insects (arachnology, myriapodology, acarology)
- Department of History and General Scientific Services
  - History of the colonial period
  - Contemporary history
  - Agricultural and forest economics (geomorphology, laboratory of wood biology)

The museum also maintains a library of some 130,000 titles. In the context of discussions about the restitution of cultural objects in museum collections of colonial origin, the AfricaMuseum started to publicly present information about the provenance of such objects in its permanent exhibition in 2021.

== Controversy ==
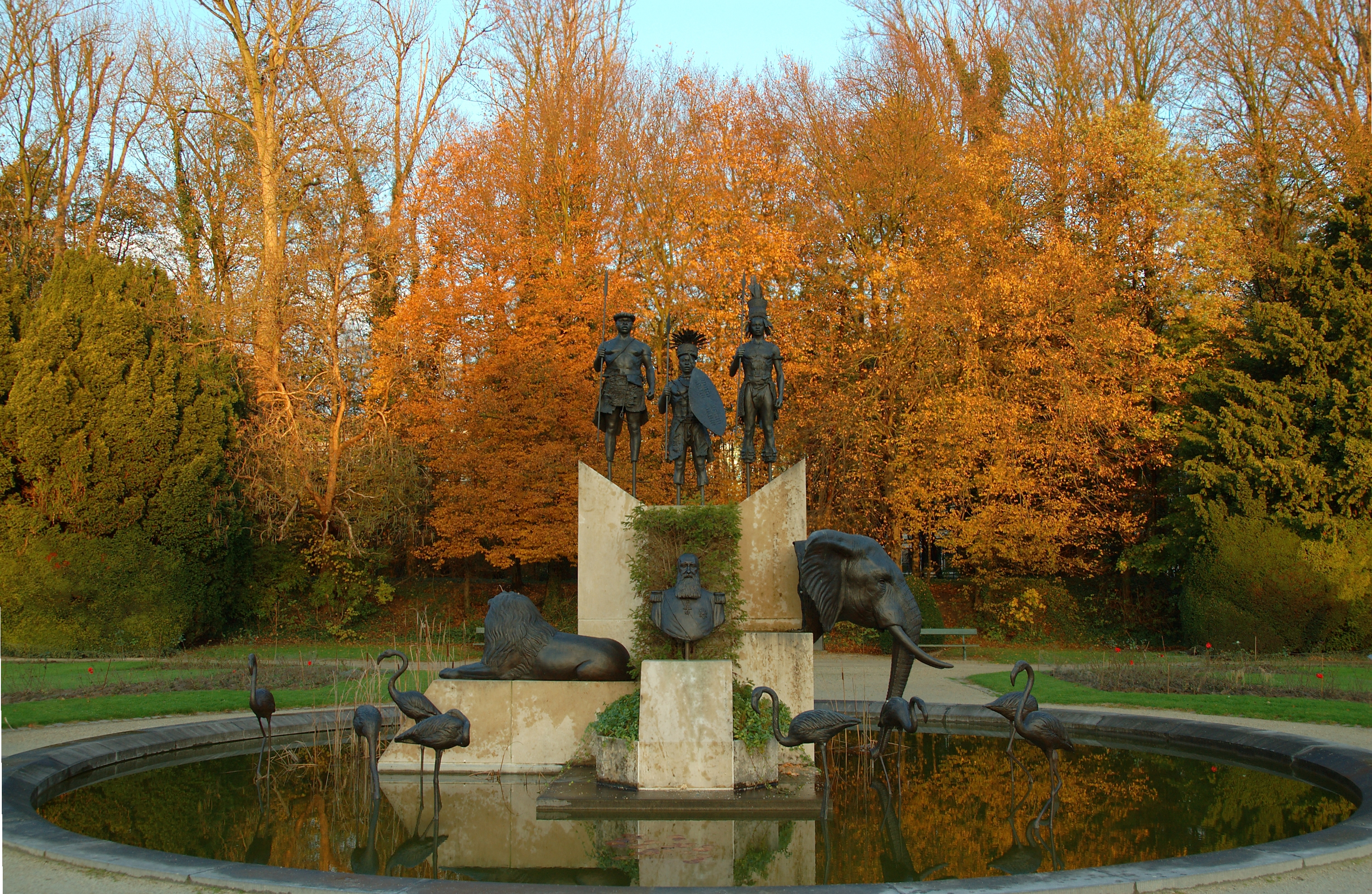
The Congo, I Presume? (Frantzen, 1997) in the museum's gardens

There has been controversy surrounding the Royal Museum for Central Africa. It had previously been called a museum that "has remained frozen in time". No mention was made of the pillage of resources and atrocities in the Congo Free State, nor during Belgium's larger colonial era. The Guardian reported in July 2002 that, after initial outrage by Belgian historians over the popular history book King Leopold's Ghost by Adam Hochschild that gives his view of the Congo Free State in what some critics called a "tendentious diatribe", the state-funded museum would finance an investigation into Hochschild's allegations.

The resulting, more modern exhibition The Memory of Congo (February–October 2005) tried to tell the story of the Congo Free State before it became a Belgian colony and a less one-sided view of the Belgian colonial era. The exhibition was praised by the international press, with French newspaper Le Monde writing that "the museum has done better than revisit a particularly stormy page in history... [It] has pushed the public to join it in looking into the reality of colonialism." Hochschild himself had a mixed critique of the renovated museum.

== Gallery ==
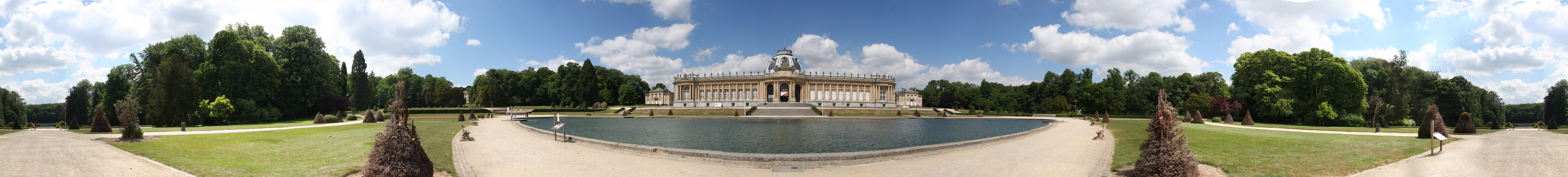
Panoramic view of the Royal Museum for Central Africa's main building and gardens

== See also ==
- Atrocities in the Congo Free State
- Belgian Federal Science Policy Office (BELSPO)
- Brussels Anti-Slavery Conference 1889–90
- Brussels Conference Act of 1890
- Archives Africaines of the Belgian SPF Affaires étrangères, Commerce extérieur et Coopération au Développement
- Belgium in the long nineteenth century

== Bibliography ==
=== Issued by the museum ===
- Verswijver; et al., eds. (1995). Masterpieces from Central Africa.
- Patricia Van Schuylenbergh (1997), La mémoire des Belges en Afrique; Inventaire des archives historiques privées du Musée royal de l'Afrique centrale de 1858 a nos jours (PDF) (in French), Musée royal de l'Afrique centrale, ISBN 2-87398-006-0
- Toma Muteba Luntumbue & Claire Ponas, ed. (2001). EXITCONGOMUSEUM/Contemporary Art.

=== About the museum ===
in English

- "Tervueren", Belgium and Holland (15th ed.), Leipzig: Karl Baedeker, 1910, OCLC 397759 – via Internet Archive, "Congo Museum"
- Jean Muteba Rahier (2003). "Ghost of Leopold II: The Belgian Royal Museum of Central Africa and Its Dusty Colonialist Exhibition". Research in African Literatures. 34.
- Véronique Bragard (2011). "'Indépendance!': The Belgo-Congolese Dispute in the Tervuren Museum". Human Architecture. ISSN 1540-5699.
- Patrick Hoenig (2014). "Visualizing trauma: the Belgian Museum for Central Africa and its discontents". Postcolonial Studies. 17. Institute of Postcolonial Studies, Melbourne. ISSN 1466-1888.

in other languages

- Anne-Marie Bouttiaux (1999). "Des mises en scène de curiosités aux chefs-d'œuvre mis en scène. Le Musée royal de l'Afrique à Tervuren: un siècle de collections". Cahiers d'Études africaines (in French). 39 (155): 595–616. doi:10.3406/cea.1999.1768 – via Persee.fr.
- Maarten Couttenier (2005). Congo Tentoongesteld. Een geschiedenis van de Belgische antropologie en het Museum van Tervuren (1882-1925) (in Dutch). Leuven: Uitgeverij Acco. OCLC 650023048.
- Maarten Couttenier (2009). "De impact van Congo in het Museum van Belgisch Congo in Tervuren (1897-1946)". In Vincent Viaene (ed.). Congo in België: koloniale cultuur in de metropool (in Dutch). Universitaire Pers Leuven. ISBN 9789058677716.

=== About the 1897 exhibition ===
- Aubry, Françoise (2000). "L'exposition de Tervueren en 1897 : scénographie Art nouveau et arts primitifs". Bruxelles carrefour de cultures (in French). Brussels: Mercator. ISBN 978-90-6153-457-0.
- Hochschild, Adam (1998). King Leopold's Ghost. Boston: Mariner Books. ISBN 978-0-358-21250-8.
- Schroeder-Gudehus, Brigitte; Rasmussen, Anne (1992). Les fastes du progrès : le guide des expositions universelles 1851-1992 (in French). Paris: Flammarion. ISBN 978-2-08-012617-7.
