= Foreign Language Area Studies =

US Federal Scholarship Program

The Foreign Language and Area Studies (FLAS) fellowships are federally funded academic scholarships designed to provide support and funding to graduate and undergraduate students studying the languages and cultures of specific foreign countries, in particular those in the strategic interest of the United States of America.

Prior to the 1970s, the fellowships were called National Defence Foreign Language Fellowships, funded by the National Defense Education Act. American universities are allotted funds from the federal government, and then the individual schools hold their own competitions to determine the recipients for both summer and year-long grants. FLAS fellowships cover tuition, school fees, medical insurance, and provide an additional living stipend. The stipends for 2009–2010 were $15,000 for an academic-year award and $2,500 for summer. Eligibility for year-long grants is limited to graduate students who are U.S. citizens or permanent residents. Undergraduates may receive summer funding.

As part of the program, fellows are required to take one language class and another academic class in their FLAS area. A language evaluation is given at the beginning and end of the program. Additionally, fellows are expected to write a summary of their FLAS achievements at the end of the fellowship period.

In 2025, the Trump administration cut funding for the program, effectively ending the fellowship. The federal government justified the cuts by stating that the program no longer served U.S. foreign policy interests.
