= Sara Berry =

American economist

Sara Sweezy Berry (born 1940) is an American scholar of contemporary African political economies, professor of history at Johns Hopkins University and co-founder of the Center for Africana Studies at Johns Hopkins.

== Biography ==
Born in Washington, DC, Berry gained a B.A. in history from Radcliffe College in 1961 and an M.A. from University of Michigan in 1965. She received her PhD in economics at the University of Michigan in 1967 and has taught at Indiana University, Virginia Commonwealth University, Boston University, Johns Hopkins University, and Northwestern University.

Berry has published four books: Cocoa, Custom, and Socio-Economic Change in Rural Western Nigeria (1975, Oxford: Clarendon Press) Fathers Work for Their Sons: Accumulation, Mobility and Class Formation in an Extended Yoruba Community (1985, University of California Press), Chiefs Know Their Boundaries: Essays on Poverty, Power and the Past in Asante, 1896-1996 (2001, Heinemann), and No Condition is Permanent: The Social Dynamics of Agrarian Change in Sub-Saharan Africa (1993, University of Wisconsin Press). Fathers Work for Their Sons won the 1986 Herskovits Prize for the year's best book on Africa.

She has worked as a consultant for the Rockefeller Foundation, the Ford Foundation, the US Agency for International Development, the National Endowment for the Humanities, and the Herskovits Book Awards Committee. She has received fellowships and awards from the Fulbright Senior Scholars Program, the Social Science Research Council, the Guggenheim Foundation, and the Mary Ingraham Bunting Institute at Radcliffe College.

== Books ==
- 2001 Chiefs know their boundaries: essays on property, power and the past, Asante, 1896–1996.Portsmouth, NH: Heinemann.
- 1993 No condition is permanent: the social dynamics of agrarian change in sub-Saharan Africa. Madison: University of Wisconsin Press.
- 1985 Fathers work for their sons: accumulation, mobility, and class formation in an extended Yoruba family. Berkeley & Los Angeles: University of California Press.
- 1975 Cocoa, custom and socio-economic change in rural western Nigeria. Oxford: Clarendon.

== Fellowships and grants ==
- 2000-2002 Faculty research funding for research on land claims and local governance in Ghana
- 1999-2000 Fellow, Center for Advanced Study in the Behavioral Sciences, Stanford, CA
- 1993-94 Fulbright Senior Scholar award for research on the dynamics of land tenure in Nigeria and Ghana.
- 1992 Social Science Research Council grant for research on land tenure in Nigeria & Ghana
- 1988 John Simon Guggenheim Memorial Fellowship
- 1984-85 Noyes Fellow, Mary Ingraham Bunting Institute, Radcliffe College
- 1978-79 Grants from Rockefeller Foundation and the National Science Foundation for research on rural-urban linkages and agrarian change in western Nigeria
- 1969-71 Midwest Universities Consortium grant for research on rural transformation in western Nigeria

== Selected articles ==
- 2004 Reinventing the local? Privatization, decentralization and the politics of resource management: examples from Africa, African Study Monographs, 52, 2: 79–101.
- 2003 Debate sobre la historia y el problema de la tierra en Africa, Revista de Historia international: ISTOR-Africa, IV, 14:69-89.
- 2002 Debating the land question in Africa, Comparative Studies in Society and History, 44, 4:638-68.
- 2002 The everyday politics of rent-seeking: land allocation on the outskirts of Kumase, in C. Lund & K. Juul, eds., Negotiating property–processes of vindication of land claims in sub-Saharan Africa, Heinemann.
- 2002 Negotiable property: making claims on land and history in Asante, 1896-1996, in George Bond & Nigel Gibson, eds., Contested terrains: contemporary Africa in focus. Westview.
- 1998 Unsettled accounts: stool debts, chieftaincy disputes and the question of Asante constitutionalism, Journal of African History, 39, 1:1-24.
- 1997 Tomatoes, land and hearsay: property and history in Asante in the time of structural adjustment, World Development, 25, 8:1225-1241.
- 1995 Stable prices, unstable values: some thoughts on monetization and the meaning of transactions in West African economies, in Jane Guyer, ed. Money matters. Instability, values and social payments in the modern history of West African communities. Heinemann.
- 1994 Resource access and management as historical processes, in C. Lund & H. Marcussen, eds. Access, control and management of natural resources in sub-Saharan Africa. Occasional Paper 13, International Development Studies, Roskilde University, Denmark.
- 1993 Coping with confusion: African farmers responses to economic instability in the 1970s and 1980s, in T. Callaghy and J. Ravenhill, eds. Hemmed in: the dilemmas of African development. New York: Columbia University Press.
- 1993 Understanding agricultural policy in Africa: the contributions of Robert Bates, World Development 21,6.
- 1993 Socio-economic aspects of cassava cultivation and use in Africa: implications for the development of appropriate technology, Collaborative Study of Cassava in Africa. Working Paper No. 8. Ibadan: International Institute of Tropical Agriculture.
- 1992 Hegemony on a shoestring: indirect rule and access to resources in Africa, Africa 62, 3:327-55.
- 1989 Social institutions and access to resources, Africa 59, 1:41-55.
- 1989 Editor, special issue on Access, Control and Use of Resources in Agriculture, Africa 59, 1.
- 1988 Concentration without privatization? Some agrarian consequences of changing patterns of rural land control in Africa, in R. Downs & S. Reyna, eds. Land and society in contemporary Africa. London and Hanover, NH: University Press of New England.
- 1988 Property rights and rural resource management: the case of tree crops in West Africa, Cahiers des Sciences Humaines, XXIV, 1:3-17.
- 1984 The food crisis and agrarian change in Africa: a review essay, African Studies Review, 27, 2:59-112.
