= Siege of Breslau (1757) =

1757 siege

- Part of the Third Silesian War (Seven Years' War)
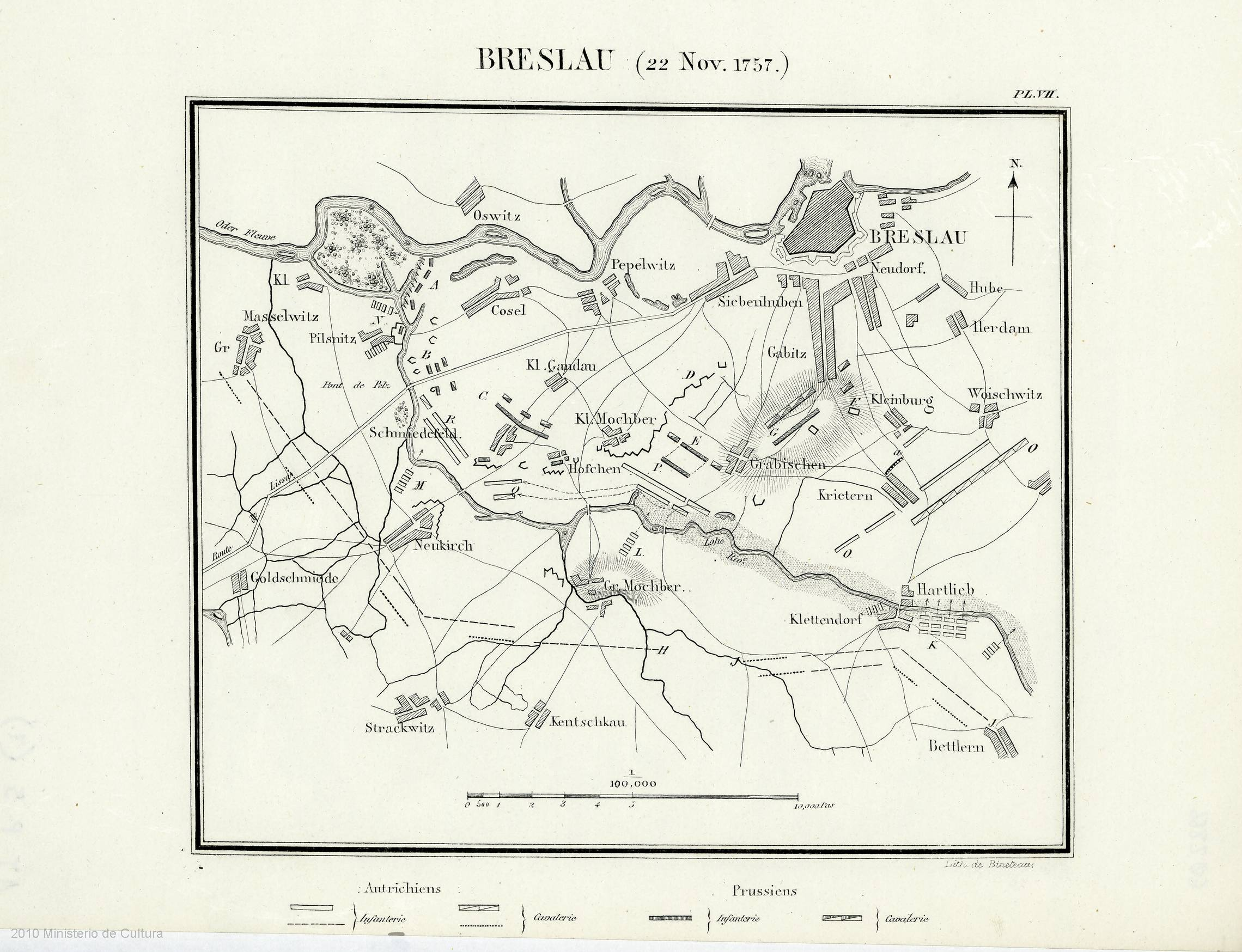
Date	7 December 1757 – 20 December 1757
Location	Breslau, Prussian Silesia, present-day Poland 51.1167°N 17.0333°E
Result	Prussian victory

Belligerents
(Kingdom of Prussia) Prussia	(Holy Roman Empire) Austria France

Commanders and leaders
Frederick the Great	Soloman Sprecher von Bernegg

Strength
36,000; 167 guns	17,000

Casualties and losses
Minimal	17,000 captured, including: 31 generals, over 700 officers, 1,000 horses, all supplies

Frederick the Great
current battle
First Silesian War
Second Silesian War
Third Silesian War

The siege of Breslau was a siege in the Third Silesian War (part of the Seven Years' War) that began on 7 December 1757 and ended on 19 December 1757. After the defeat at Leuthen, the Austrians withdrew into Breslau. The combined Austro-French garrison of approximately 17,000 men, commanded by Lieutenant General Field Marshal Soloman Sprecher von Bernegg, faced a Prussian army commanded by Frederick the Great.

== Background ==
After over-running Saxony, Frederick next campaigned in Bohemia. Learning that French forces had invaded his ally's territory of Hanover, Frederick moved west. On 5 November 1757, he defeated the combined French and Austrian force at the Battle of Rossbach. The Austrians had managed to retake Silesia: Prince Charles had taken the city of Schweidnitz and moved into lower Silesia. Frederick learned of the fall of Breslau (22 November). He and his men covered 274 kilometers (170 mi) in 12 days and, at Liegnitz, joined up with the Prussian troops who had survived the fighting at Breslau. This augmented army of about 33,000 troops arrived near Leuthen (now Lutynia, Poland), 27 km (17 mi) west of Breslau, to find 65,000 Austrians in possession. In a decisive action, the Prussians executed a difficult oblique maneuver to attack the Austrians at the weakest part of the line; the Battle of Leuthen turned into a rout. The Austrians fell back into Bohemia, once again leaving Silesia to the rising Prussians. Charles and his second in command, Count Leopold Joseph von Daun were "sunk in the depths of despondency", and the prince could not fathom what had happened. Frederick had sent half Hans Joachim von Zieten's cavalry and some light troops chasing Charles' retreating army, now heading toward Königgratz and took the bulk of his army to Breslau.

The Austrians were determined to hold Breslau, not only because losing it would cost them control of Silesia and considerable prestige, but also for the immense quantities of stores it held. By chasing Charles' army well into Bohemia, the Prussians guaranteed that the Austrian garrison at Breslau would remain isolated. The Austrian commander, recognizing his grim plight, posted placards on gallows and poles throughout the city, warning anyone who spoke of surrender would be instantly hanged.

== Garrison ==
The Imperial commander, Soloman Sprecher von Bernegg, was 57-years-old, and had attained the rank of lieutenant field marshal. He was a life long military veteran, having served in the Spanish or Habsburg military since his late boyhood. In addition to serving as war commission in Lombardy, following the War of Austrian Succession he had served as the garrison commander at Como. Sprecher commanded a mixed force from France, Baden-Baden, Wuerttemberg, Bavaria, some mixed mercenary regiments from the Netherlands, and several regiments from the military frontier.

== Siege is laid ==
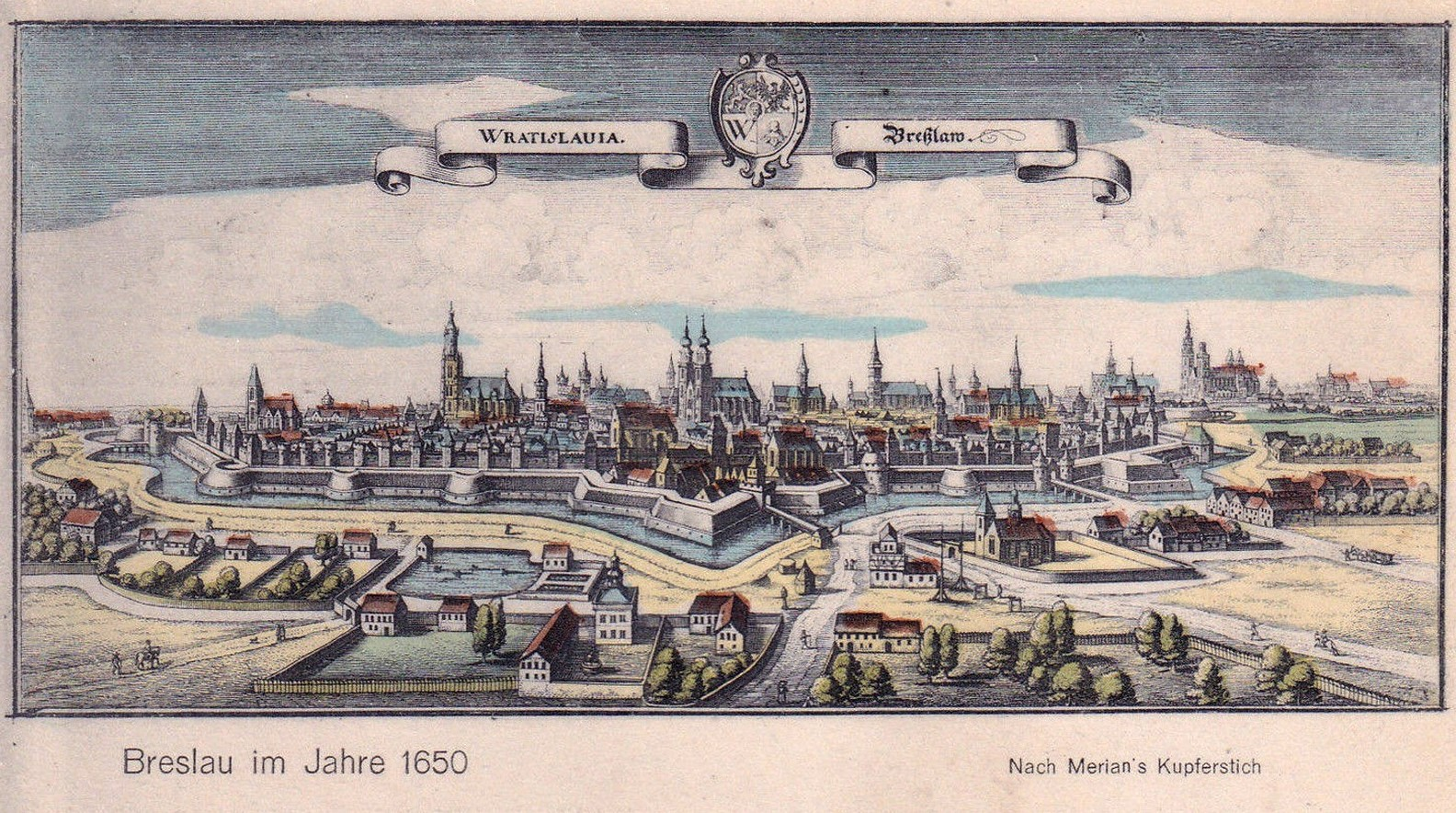
Breslau, 17th century. The various sections on the outside of the wall and moat would have been especially vulnerable to Frederick's army.

The weather was bitterly cold, with a combination of rain and snow, and both the besiegers and the besieged suffered miserably. By 7 December, the Prussians had isolated the city from all communications and began construction of their batteries. In the following days, they took possession of the moats, dug fortifications and erected batteries; as soon as a battery was constructed, its assaults began. By 12 December, the Prussian troops, commanded by Prince Ferdinand, had control of the St. Moritz church in the city suburbs, and erected a new battery with two cannons and two mortars.

Prussians assaulted the walls again and again; the abatis and trenches were close to freezing over. On 14 December, one of the Breslau magazines caught fire during a heavy bombardment; the magazine exploded, destroying several houses. While the Austrians were dealing with the fire, the Prussians expanded their battery south of the city. The weather worsened, and the Prussia siege lines pressed closer to the walls. Sappers began digging under the defenses.

On the night of 13–14 December, General Wied zu Neuwied and his Prussian force took the Polnischen Vorstadt adjacent to the Oder river, and captured 51 Pandurs. On the 14th, the Brothers of St. Moritz church fled into the city. At 1500 that afternoon, all communication between the city and the outside world was sealed off, when the Prussians overwhelmed the last outposts outside the walls. On that night, the Prussians had repaired their largest battery, and opened fire on the city again. Within hours it had scored a hit on a second magazine, destroying part of the defending lines with it and killing or wounding about 800 of the defenders. The assault continued, day and night, for the next three days.

In the night of the 15–16, the Prussians extended their parallel to 1000 steps, and began construction of a salient; the next day they started the sapping. Sprecher also reported that the Prussians used the so-called ricochet, balls fired into the city at a low angle that would barely clear the parapet and then bounce before exploding. These destroyed several gun emplacements and demolished several areas of the parapet.

Finally, on 19 December, seeing no hope of relief from either Daun or Prince Charles, Sprecher prepared to surrender the city to the Prussians. By 20 December, the Prussians had control of all the gates of the city and the following day, the Austrians and French marched out through the Schweidnitz gate.

== Consequences ==
The Austrians and the French lost 17,000 troops, the entire garrison, plus the entirety of the stores in Breslau, over 1000 horses, 81 guns, and almost 700 officers, including 13 generals. About 1200 of the defending force was killed. The officers and men were permitted to keep their personal effects but all other provisions and materials were surrendered to the Prussians.

The Prussians acquired massive amounts of stores, and also acquired 1024 horses, and 220 wagons. The Prussians retook 37 artillery pieces that had been captured from them during the summer actions, plus another 44 Austrian artillery pieces. In addition, an unspecified number of Prussian officers who had been imprisoned in Breslau were freed.

60,100 bushels of rye
1,445 bushels of wheat
24,606 bushels of meal
6,670 bushels of barley
18,663 bushels of hay
1,500 bales of straw
144,000 florins (Note: The Holy Roman Empire had replaced its old florin with the Conventionsthaler, which contained 1/9th of ounce of silver, or approximately 23.39 grams.)

The defeat of Breslau put the seal on Austria's loss of fertile Silesia; the disastrous December, which included the debilitating loss at Leuthen, followed by Charles' precipitous retreat across Silesia and into Bohemia, and finally the loss of the garrison at Breslau, erased all of Austria's summer gains. Maria Theresa did not despair of winning this war against Frederick and recovering part of her patrimony (Silesia) that she had lost in 1748, but she removed her brother-in-law Charles from command of the army and sent him to the Netherlands, where he was better suited as governor. She placed Count Leopold Joseph von Daun in command of her army in Bohemia.
