= Leuthen =

Leuthen may refer to:

- Lutynia, Gmina Miękinia (German: Leuthen), a town in Poland
- Battle of Leuthen, a 1757 battle during the Seven Years' War
- Wolf pack Leuthen, a group of German U-boats that operated during the Battle of the Atlantic in World War II
