= Joseph Count Lucchesi d' Averna =

Joseph, Count Lucchesi d' Averna, was a lieutenant field marshal in the Habsburg Army during the Seven Years' War.

At the Battle of Leuthen, he rallied his cavalry against the onslaught of the Prussian oblique maneuver. Luccesi had been promoted 25 March 1741 to Generalfeldwachtmeister (master general of field guards). This is an obsolete rank, above colonel, which was superseded by the rank of major general.

He was promoted on 5 July 1745 to lieutenant field marshal. Later, he was promoted to General of the Cavalry on 12 June 1754, with rank retroactive to 3 December 1748 .

Count Lucchesi d' Averna died on 5 December 1757, in Leuthen, Silesia. He was decapitated by a cannon shot, while leading an attack against the 26th infantry, in an attempt to take the Butterberg artillery of the Prussians.
