= Battle of Breslau (1757) =

1757 battle during the Third Silesian War

Coordinates: 51.1167°N 17.0333°E

- Part of the Third Silesian War (Seven Years' War)
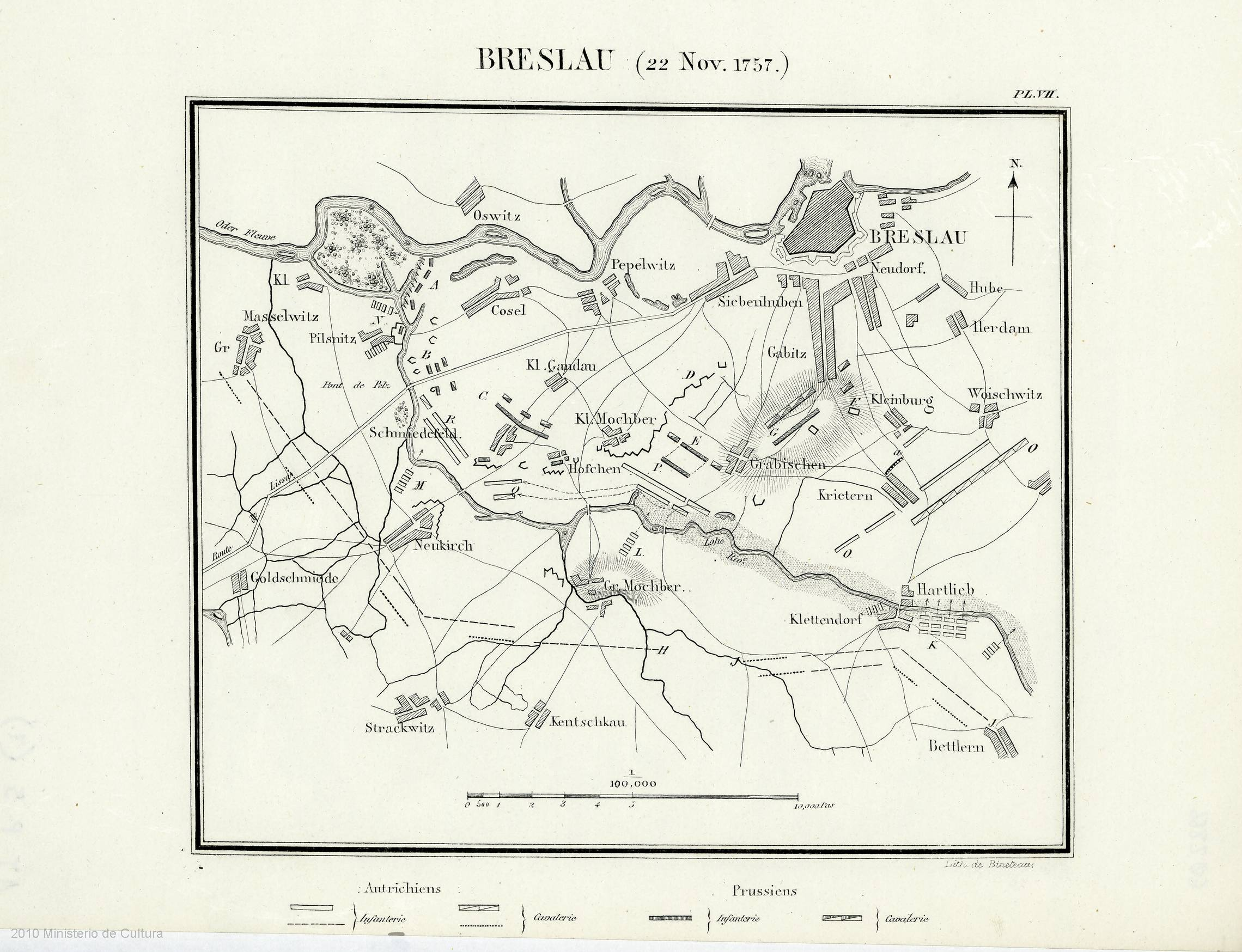
- Map of the battle
Date	22 November 1757
Location	Breslau, Kingdom of Prussia (now Poland)
Result	Austrian victory

Belligerents
(Kingdom of Prussia) Prussia	(Holy Roman Empire) Austria

Commanders and leaders
August Wilhelm, Duke of Brunswick-Bevern	Prince Charles Alexander of Lorraine

Strength
28,000	60,000

Casualties and losses
10,150; • 6,350 killed and wounded; • 3,800 captured	5,857

The Battle of Breslau (also known as the Battle on the Lohe) was fought on 22 November 1757 in Breslau (now Wrocław, Poland) during the Third Silesian War (part of the Seven Years' War). A Prussian army of 28,000 men fought an Austrian army of 60,000 men. The Prussians held off the Austrian attack, losing 6,000 men to the Austrians' 5,000 men. But one day later the Prussians beat a retreat. Breslau's garrison surrendered on 25 November 1757.

== Background ==
Although the Seven Years' War was a global conflict, it acquired a specific intensity in the European theater based on the recently concluded War of the Austrian Succession (1741–1748). The 1748 Treaty of Aix-la-Chapelle concluded the earlier war with Austria. Frederick II of Prussia, known as Frederick the Great, acquired the prosperous province of Silesia. Empress Maria Theresa of Austria had signed the treaty to gain time to rebuild her military forces and forge new alliances; she intended to regain ascendancy in the Holy Roman Empire. In 1754, escalating tensions between Britain and France in North America offered the Empress the opportunity to regain her lost territories and to limit Prussia's ever growing power. Similarly, France sought to break the British dominance of Atlantic trade. France and Austria put aside their old rivalry to form a coalition of their own. Britain aligned herself with the Kingdom of Prussia; this alliance drew in not only the British king's territories held in personal union, including Hanover, but also those of his relatives such as in the Landgraviate of Hesse-Kassel. This series of political maneuvers became known as the Diplomatic Revolution.

After over-running Saxony, Frederick campaigned in Bohemia and defeated the Austrians on 6 May 1757 at the Battle of Prague. Learning that French forces had invaded his ally's territory of Hanover, Frederick moved west. On 5 November 1757, he defeated the combined French and Austrian force at the Battle of Rossbach. In his absence, the Austrians had managed to retake Silesia: Prince Charles had taken the city of Schweidnitz and moved on Breslau in Lower Silesia.

== Prelude ==
The duke of Brunswick-Bevern was supposed to cover Silesia with a force of 28,000 troops. This soon turned out to be a difficult task as he had to face the superior Austrian forces, whose main army of 54,000 troops was led by Prince Charles Alexander of Lorraine and Count Leopold Joseph von Daun. The corps of 28,000 troops under Franz Leopold von Nádasdy was also able to advance to the front. Despite their overwhelming superiority, the Austrians wanted to initially avoid a battle.

After Nádasdy's corps had been reinforced bringing its strength up to 43,000 troops, the Austrians surrounded Schweidnitz on 14 October. The handover then took place on 13 November. Until then, Bevern had managed to keep the main Austrian army engaged in battle. However, after joining Nádasdy's corps it had been considerably strengthened.

As a direct result of the additional reinforcements, the Austrian army command gave up their position and decided to launch an immediate attack on the Prussians; their intention was to take Breslau before the arrival of the main Prussian forces so that they would be unable to winter in Silesia.

The Prussians had over 40 battalions and 102 squadrons at their disposal (totaling 28,400 troops). The Austrian army, however, consisted of 96 battalions, 93 grenadier companies, 141 squadrons and 228 artillery pieces (totaling 83.606 troops).

== Course of battle ==
Prince Charles Alexander of Lorraine attacked the Prussian forces on 22 November outside the gates of Breslau, between the villages of Kosel und Gräbschen, launching the battle with a cannonade. The Prussians, who had taken up fortified positions in the surrounding villages, were then attacked at three separate points. After the Austrians were able to conquer the first few villages, they manned them with howitzers and intensified their cannonade, after which the duke of Brunswick-Bevern gathered ten regiments together and began a counter-attack. A tough, bloody struggle for the villages began, in which the Prussians were able to score several decisive successes against the superior Austrian forces. It has never been established whether Bevern wanted to lead another counter-attack the next day or retreat. Nevertheless, the Prussians did retreat, which seemed to have begun suddenly as if on cue, whether it had been ordered or not. The battle field was consequently abandoned to Prince Charles and the Prussians went back to Glogau via Breslau.

The battle, which had lasted almost the entire day, cost the Austrians 5,723 men and the Prussians 6,350 men.

== Results ==
Following the withdrawal of the Prussian army, 10 battalions under General Johann Georg von Lestwitz remained behind in the fortress of Breslau. The Austrians immediately laid siege under the direction of General Nádasdy. The Austrian-minded population of Breslau made the Prussians' defense difficult as not only did Breslau's citizens pressure Lestwitz to vacate the fortress but they also aided any Prussian deserters.

Prussian morale was extremely low due to their defeat on the battlefield and the high proportion of conscripts serving in the army. Discipline almost collapsed. Lestwitz surrendered on the night of 25 November on condition of being allowed to withdraw unhindered. Out of the 4,227 Prussian soldiers, only 599 of them began the march to Glogau; the rest deserted.

Frederick had been marching west to help his British allies defend Hanover. Due to these events, Frederick was forced to completely change his campaign plans. Before reversing his course, though, he soundly defeated an allied force of French and Austrian troops at the Battle of Rossbach. After the battle, he reversed his course and in 12 days covered the 272 km (169 mi) to Leuthen. There, on 4 December, he executed a brilliantly conceived plan of maneuver and subterfuge, fooling both Prince Charles and Daun. Following his decisive win at Leuthen, most of the Austrians defending the city decamped, although they left behind a garrison of 17,000 plus stores and ammunition, commanded by Soloman Sprecher von Bernegg. After a brief but brutal siege, Frederick forced the capitulation in late December 1757.

== Bibliography ==
- Davies, Norman & Moorhouse, Roger. Microcosm: Portrait of a Central European City. Pimlico. London, 2003, pp. 206–208. ISBN 0-7126-9334-3 (with a map of the battle on page 513.)
- Clodfelter, M. (2017). Warfare and Armed Conflicts: A Statistical Encyclopedia of Casualty and Other Figures, 1492-2015 (4th ed.). Jefferson, North Carolina: McFarland. ISBN 978-0-7864-7470-7.
- The encyclopedia of warfare. London: Amber Books. 2013. ISBN 9781782740230.
