= Soloman Sprecher von Bernegg =

Austrian military commander (1697–1758)

Solomon Sprecher von Bernegg
- Born: 14 December 1697; Chur, Canton Grisons, Swiss Confederation
- Died: 14 September 1758 (aged 60); Aussig, Bohemia
- Military career
- Allegiance: Habsburg monarchy
- Rank: Feldzeugmeister
- Conflicts: War of Austrian Succession; Seven Years' War

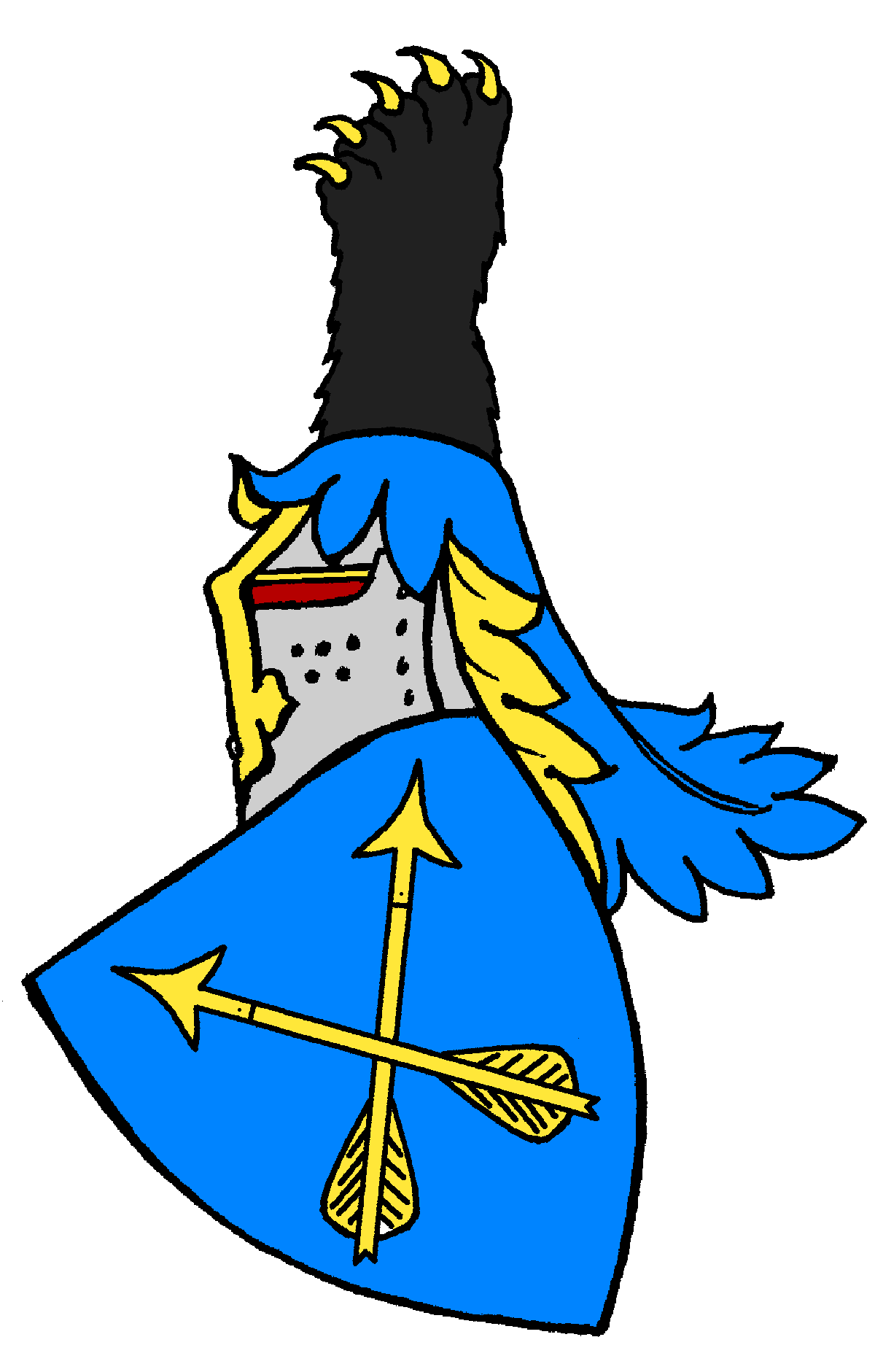
Family crest of Sprecher von Bernegg

Soloman Sprecher von Bernegg (14 December 1697 – 14 September 1758) was a Habsburg military commander in the War of Austrian Succession and the Seven Years' War.

== Family ==
He was born in Chur, on 14 December 1697, the son of Johann Andreas, Landmann, and his wife Maria Terz. He descended from the Davos line of the noble Sprecher von Bernegg family. He married twice: to Dorothea Maria Sprecher von Bernegg, daughter of Johann, a fellow lieutenant in Spanish service, and in 1738, to Elisabeth Ursula Buol, daughter of Stephan Buol.

== Education and early military service ==
He attended the Gymnasium in Halle and in 1717 entered into Spanish military service. In 1728 he was appointed as the Military commissioner in Lombardy. In 1736 he entered the Regiment von Schauenstein, and, in 1743, he received command of his own regiment in the service of Maria Theresa. After the Siege of Genoa, he was sent to Como, where he commanded the garrison from 1751 to 1757. In 1754 he was appointed lieutenant field marshal. In the Seven Years' War, Sprecher distinguished himself during the Siege of Prague, by leading an assault on the Prussian line whereupon he was appointed general of the artillery in 1757.

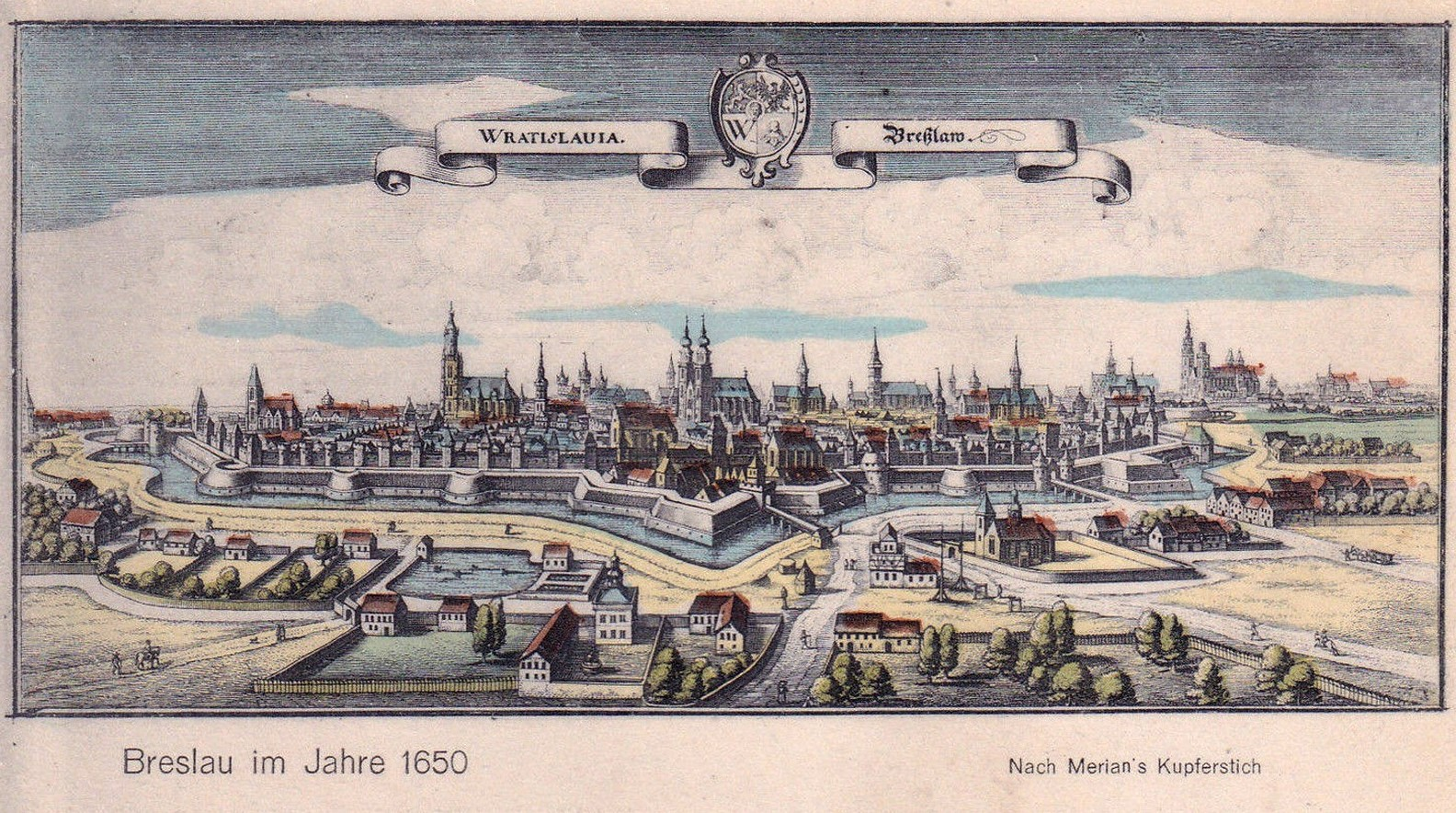
Breslau was heavily fortified when Sprecher commanded it during the 1757 siege.

Prior to the Battle of Rossbach, Sprecher commanded a small force of grenadiers near Schoenau, part of the game of cat and mouse that the Austrians, French, and Prussians played prior to the battle. Prior to the Battle of Schweidnitz, Sprecher commanded the Austrian right wing; in consequence of an artillery dual, the Duke of Bevern moved his forces away from the Austrians, abandoning about 200,000 rations in the process. At the Battle of Breslau, Specher led the first wave across the Gross Moecherbern bridge, including some infantry units, 35 full companies of grenadiers, mounted grenadiers. At about 1:30 pm, Sprecher had pushed out the battalions of Caspar Ernst von Schultze's battalion; Schultze himself was wounded (and died later); the Austrian attack also pushed out the Prussians holding the great battery. Eventually, once the Prussian garrison at Breslau was isolated, they were offered, and accepted, the opportunity to withdraw.

Subsequently, Sprecher commanded the Austrian garrison at Breslau in 1757. Shortly after the Battle of Leuthen, the garrison was augmented with Austrian troops, and subsequently besieged by Frederick the Great and his army on 7 December 1757. After approximately two weeks of bombardment, resulting in enormous hardship on the Allied troops within, the garrison surrendered to the Prussians. A court assembled to consider the terms of his capitulation ended with complete exoneration for his actions, and the Empress promoted him to Feldzeugmeister. On the way to take command of the Austrian army corps destined to fight in Saxony, he became ill on his way to Prague, and died in Aussig.

His name is sometimes spelled Salmon or Saloman. Some sources misidentify the commander of Breslau as Johann Andreas Sprecher von Bernegg (1702–1765), but this was his younger brother.

== Sources ==
=== Reading ===
- Behr, Andreas Behr. Diplomatie als Familiengeschäft: Die Casati als spanisch-mailändische Gesandte in Luzern und Chur (1660–1700), Chronos Verlag, 2016, ISBN 9783034012935
- Leu, Hans Jacob. Allgemeines Helvetisches, Eydgenößisches, Oder Schweitzerisches ..., Volume 5, Hans Ulrich Denzler, 1751
- Redman, Herbert. Frederick the Great and the Seven Years' War, 1756–1763, McFarland, 2014
- Sprecher, Daniel, "Sprecher", Neue Deutsche Biographie 24 (2010), S. 745–746.
- Sprecher, Salomon von Bernegg, Diarium der Belagerung von Breslau; und Capitulations-Puncte von der Uebergabe an Se. Königl. Majestät in Preussen: Nebst einem Verzeichniß mit Nahmen, derer Generals, Staabs-Officiers und andern Officiers, dann vom Feldwebel an summariter derer Kayserl. Königl. Trouppen, so den 21ten December .... Berlin, 1758.
- Tucker, Spencer, Battles that Changed History: an Encyclopedia of World Conflict. ABC-CLIO, 2010. ISBN 9781598844290
- Wanner, Kurt. Solomon von Sprecher, Historisches Lexikon der Schweiz,10 January 2013 version.
