= Battle of Leuthen =

1757 battle of the Seven Years' War

- Part of the Third Silesian War and the Seven Years' War
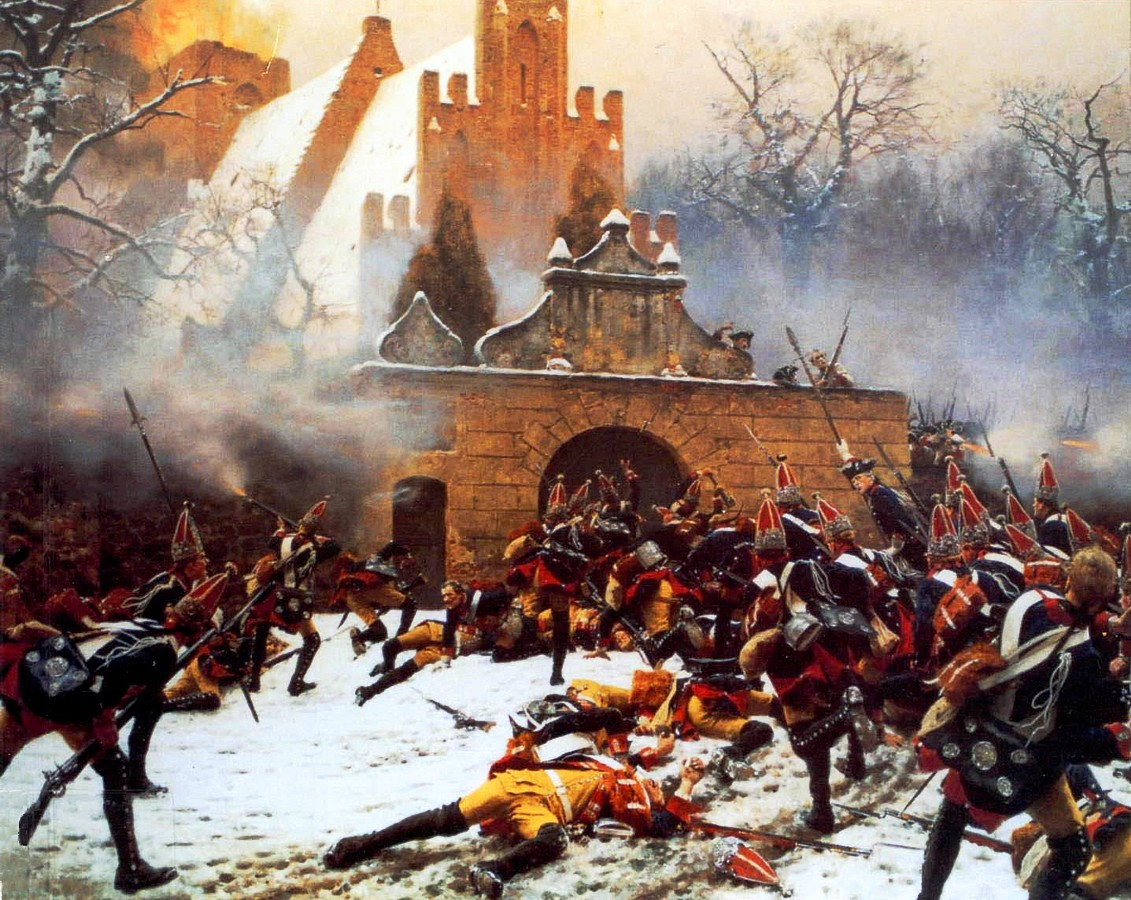
- Storming of the breach by Prussian grenadiers
Date	5 December 1757
Location	Leuthen, Silesia, Prussia (present-day Lutynia, Poland) 51°09′08″N 16°45′09″E
Result	Prussian victory

Belligerents
Prussia	Austria

Commanders and leaders
Frederick II	Charles Alexander of Lorraine; Joseph von Daun

Strength
36,000; 167 guns	65,000; 210 guns

Casualties and losses
1,141 killed 5,118 wounded 85 captured Total: 6,344 casualties	3,000 killed 7,000 wounded 12,000 captured Total: 22,000 casualties 116 guns captured

Frederick the Great
current battle
First Silesian War
Second Silesian War
Third Silesian War

The Battle of Leuthen /ˈlɔɪtən/ was fought on 5 December 1757 between Frederick the Great's Prussian Army and an Austrian army commanded by Prince Charles of Lorraine and Count Leopold Joseph von Daun. Frederick used maneuver warfare and knowledge of the terrain to rout the larger Austrian force completely. The victory ensured Prussian control of Silesia during the Third Silesian War, which was part of the Seven Years' War.

The battle was fought in and around the town of Leuthen (now Lutynia, Poland), 10 km (6 mi) northwest of Breslau, (now Wrocław, Poland), in Prussian (formerly Austrian) Silesia. By exploiting the training of his troops and his superior knowledge of the terrain, Frederick created a diversion at one end of the battlefield and moved most of his smaller army behind a series of low hillocks. The surprise attack in oblique order on the unsuspecting Austrian flank baffled Prince Charles, who took several hours to realize that the main action was to his left, not his right. Within seven hours, the Prussians had destroyed the Austrians and erased any advantage that the Austrians had gained throughout the campaigning in the preceding summer and autumn. Within 48 hours, Frederick had laid siege to Breslau, which resulted in the city's surrender on 19–20 December.

Leuthen was the last battle at which Prince Charles commanded the Austrian Army before his sister-in-law, Empress Maria Theresa, appointed him as governor of the Habsburg Netherlands and placed Leopold Joseph von Daun in command of the army. The battle also established beyond doubt Frederick's military reputation in European circles and was arguably his greatest tactical victory. After the Battle of Rossbach on 5 November, the French had refused to participate further in Austria's war with Prussia, and after Leuthen (5 December), Austria could not continue the war by itself.

== Background ==
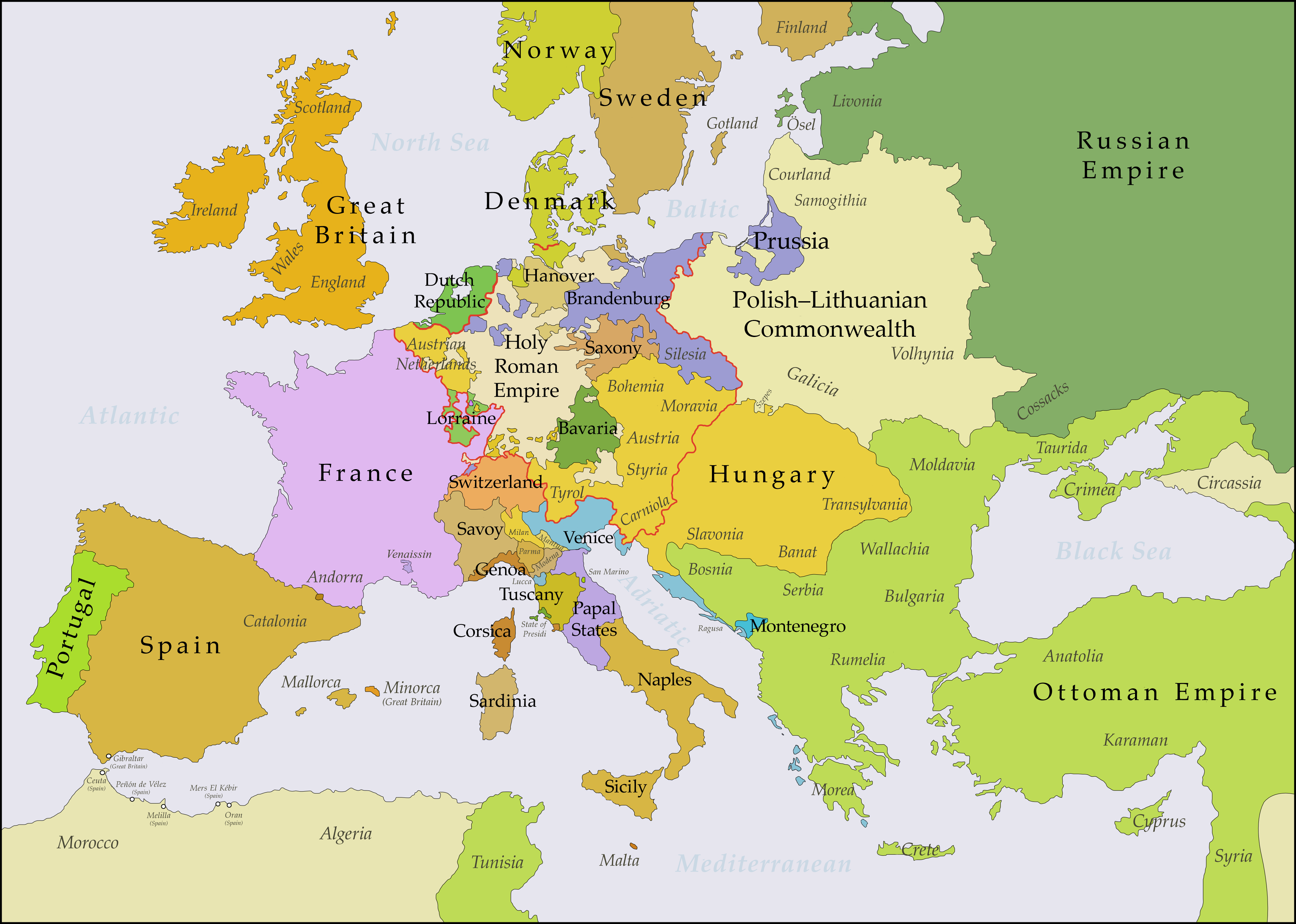
Europe in the years after the Treaty of Aix-la-Chapelle. Austria is in yellow, and Prussia, with the Province of Silesia, is in purple.

Although the Seven Years' War was a global conflict, it acquired a specific intensity in the European theater as a result of the competition between Frederick II of Prussia, known as Frederick the Great, and Maria Theresa of Austria. Their rivalry dated from 1740, when upon Maria Theresa's ascension, Frederick had attacked and annexed the prosperous province of Silesia. The 1748 Treaty of Aix-la-Chapelle, which concluded the War of the Austrian Succession (1740–1748) between Prussia and Maria Theresa's allies, awarded Silesia to Prussia. Maria Theresa had signed the treaty to gain time to rebuild her military forces and forge new alliances and intended to regain her ascendancy in the Holy Roman Empire and to reacquire Silesia. Similarly, France sought to break the British dominance of the Atlantic trade.

In 1754, escalating tensions between Britain and France in North America offered the Empress the opportunity to regain her lost territories and to limit Prussia's ever-growing power. France and Austria put aside their old rivalry to form a coalition of their own; Maria Theresa agreed that one of her daughters, Maria Antonia, would marry the Dauphin of France, and her chief ministers negotiated a military and political pact advantageous to both parties. That drove Britain to align herself with George II's nephew, Frederick II. Their alliance also involved the Electorate of Hanover, which was held in personal union by George, along with George's and Frederick's relatives, who ruled the Principality of Brunswick-Wolfenbüttel and the Landgraviate of Hesse-Kassel. That series of political manoeuvers became known as the Diplomatic Revolution.

When war broke out in 1756, Frederick overran Saxony and campaigned in Bohemia, where he defeated the Austrians on 6 May 1757 at the Battle of Prague. Learning that the French forces had invaded his ally's territory of Hanover, Frederick moved west. On 5 November 1757, an infantry regiment of about 1,000 men and 1,500 of his cavalry defeated the combined French and Austrian force of 30,000 at the Battle of Rossbach in a 90-minute battle. In his absence, however, the Austrians had managed to retake Silesia: the Empress's brother-in-law, Prince Charles, took the city of Schweidnitz and moved on Breslau in lower Silesia.

Heading back to Silesia, Frederick learned of the fall of Breslau in late November. He and his 22,000 men covered 274 km (170 mi) in 12 days and, at Liegnitz, joined up with the Prussian troops who had survived the fighting at Breslau. The augmented army of about 33,000 troops, with approximately 167 cannons, arrived near Leuthen to find 66,000 Austrians in possession.

== Terrain and troop strengths ==
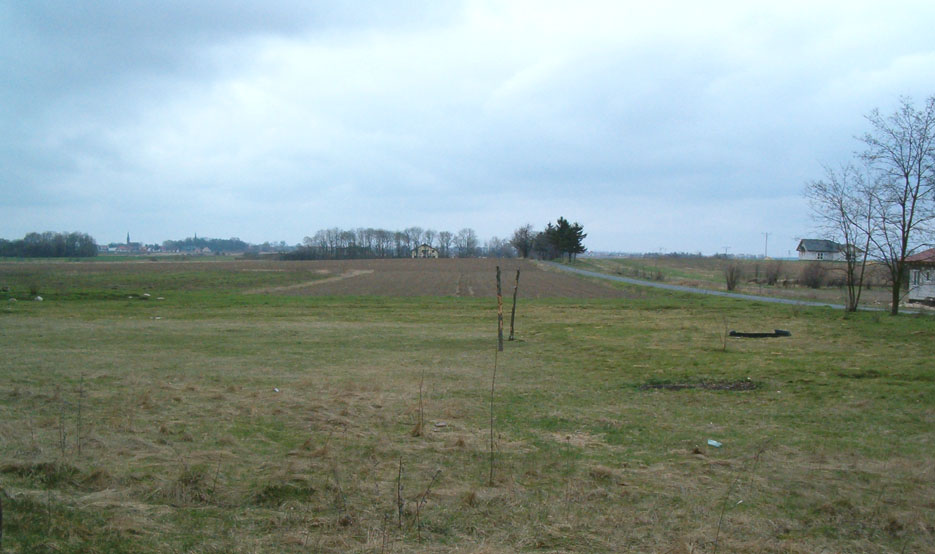
Leuthen stands with rolling grasslands in which Charles distributed his troops in a long line across fields to the village visible in the distance. Charles directed his operations from the tower of one of the churches.

Most of Lower Silesia is a rolling plain of fertile land. It includes black and alluvial soils near Breslau (Wrocław) and in river valleys, mixed with more sandy soils. Between the Oder river and the foot of the Sudeten Mountains, it has mild climate, fertile soils and extensive water network, which made it a coveted agricultural resource.

In the area northwest of Breslau, the absence of steep hills makes the observation of an approaching enemy easy, and the relative flatness limited hiding manoeuvers. The presence of alluvial soil guaranteed relatively-soft ground, less than what Frederick would face at Kunersdorf in 1758 but enough to provide the occasional natural bogs to bar the passage of troops in some locations or to muffle the sound of marching and horses' hooves. The area around Leuthen included several hamlets and villages: principally, Nypern, about 5.6 km (3 mi) north; Frobelwitz, also to the north, about halfway between Leuthen and Nypern; Gohlau, 3 km (2 mi) to the southeast; and Lissa (now a district of Wrocław), 6.1 km (4 mi) to the east. A road connected the villages of Borne, Leuthen, and Lissa with Breslau, across the Oder River and its tributaries.

=== Habsburgs ===
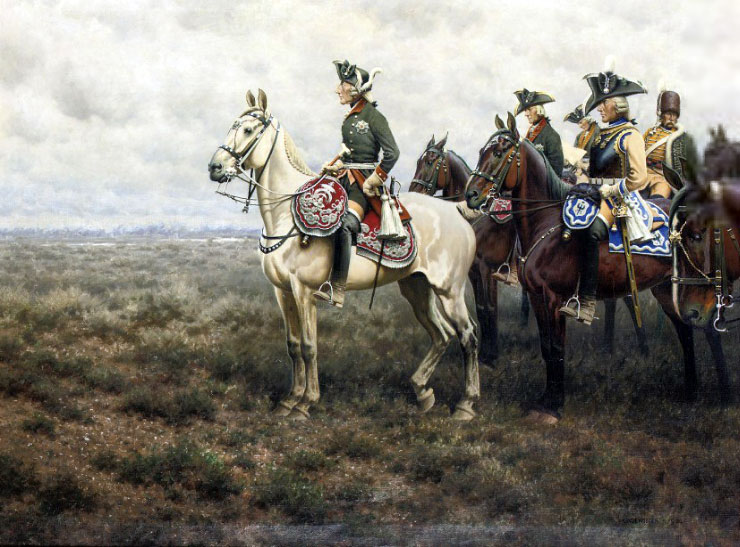
At Borne, Frederick the Great and his staff develop their battle plan, as illustrated by Hugo Ungewitter

Aware of Frederick's approach, Charles and his second-in-command, Count Leopold Joseph von Daun, positioned the army facing west on a 8 km (5 mi) front in country of undulating plains. The Prince deployed his troops in two lines, the right wing at his northernmost point, anchored at Nypern. Leuthen served as the Austrian centre. Charles established his command post there by using a church tower as his observation post and stationing seven battalions in the village itself. The majority of Charles' forces stood on his right wing. A small advanced post stood at Borne, but with Frederick's arrival in force, it withdrew immediately to the east. The Austrian position intersected at right angles with the principal road between Borne and Breslau and passed through Frobelwitz and Lissa. He secured Nypern with eight grenadier companies and placed his cavalry at Guckerwitz (now Kokorzyce, part of the village Krępice). The Austrian line extended as far south as Sagschütz (now Zakrzyce), where his cavalry stood at right angles to the infantry and created a line between Sagschütz and Gohlau. The positions were secured with additional grenadiers and pickets. Troops filled villages and woods, and hastily made abatis and redoubts. Pickets guarded all communication points as well as road and path crossings. The left wing was his shortest, with cavalry placed at the far end, near a stream by the village of Gohlau. Charles had an amalgamated force of Habsburg troops, including several contingents from the Military Frontier and imperial troops from the Duchies of Württemberg and Bavaria.

=== Prussia ===
Frederick had learned the countryside by heart on previous maneuvers. On 4 December 1757, from his position on the Schönberg, a knoll about 1.5 km (1 mi) west of Borne, he surveyed the familiar landscape with his generals, and a plan emerged. In front of him, a cluster of low hills dotted the landscape along an axis approximately parallel to the Austrian line. He knew the names of the hills: Schleierberg, Sophienberg, Wachberg and Butterberg. They were hardly hills, more like hillocks, but were high enough to provide a screen for his troops. Facing an army twice his size, he had to rely on his own army's tactical training and to use the terrain to maneuver his men into an optimal position. Frederick had one of the finest armies in Europe: any company of his troops fired at least four volleys a minute, and some of them could fire a phenomenal five, which was twice the rate of fire of most other European armies. The Prussians could maneuver better than any of the armies in Europe and could march faster, and they had just come from a resounding success at Rossbach. His artillery could quickly deploy and redeploy to support his infantry. His cavalry, superbly trained, could maneuver and charge with horses flank to flank and riders knee to knee and move at a full gallop.

== Battle ==
=== Prussian feint ===
The foggy weather made it difficult to see positions from either side, but Frederick and his commanders used the fog to their advantage. Leaving a cavalry unit and a cluster of infantry in front of the northernmost end of the Austrian line (the Austrian right), Frederick deployed the remainder, the bulk of his forces toward Leuthen itself. Charles saw them start their redeployment and may have interpreted the maneuver as withdrawal at least for a while.

At 4:00 a.m. on Sunday, Frederick moved toward the Austrian right wing in four columns, with infantry in the inner two and cavalry in the outer two. Using the knolls to block the Austrians' view of his movements, Frederick shifted the two columns of infantry and one of cavalry obliquely to his own right. The leftmost column of cavalry remained behind to convince the Austrians that it was still approaching directly at the latter end of the Austrian line, near Frobelwitz. The visible distraction screened Frederick's intent of executing an oblique maneuver like the one that he had used successfully only weeks earlier at the Battle of Rossbach. Prince Charles, watching from his vantage point, moved his entire reserve to his right flank. That not only weakened the left flank but also stretched his front from Leuthen past Frobelwitz and on to Nypern and extended it well beyond its original 4 km (2 mi).

While a single column of cavalry mesmerised Charles at his rightmost flank, the rest of the Prussians continued undetected, behind those hills across the Austrian front and overreached the Austrian left wing.

=== Oblique maneuver ===
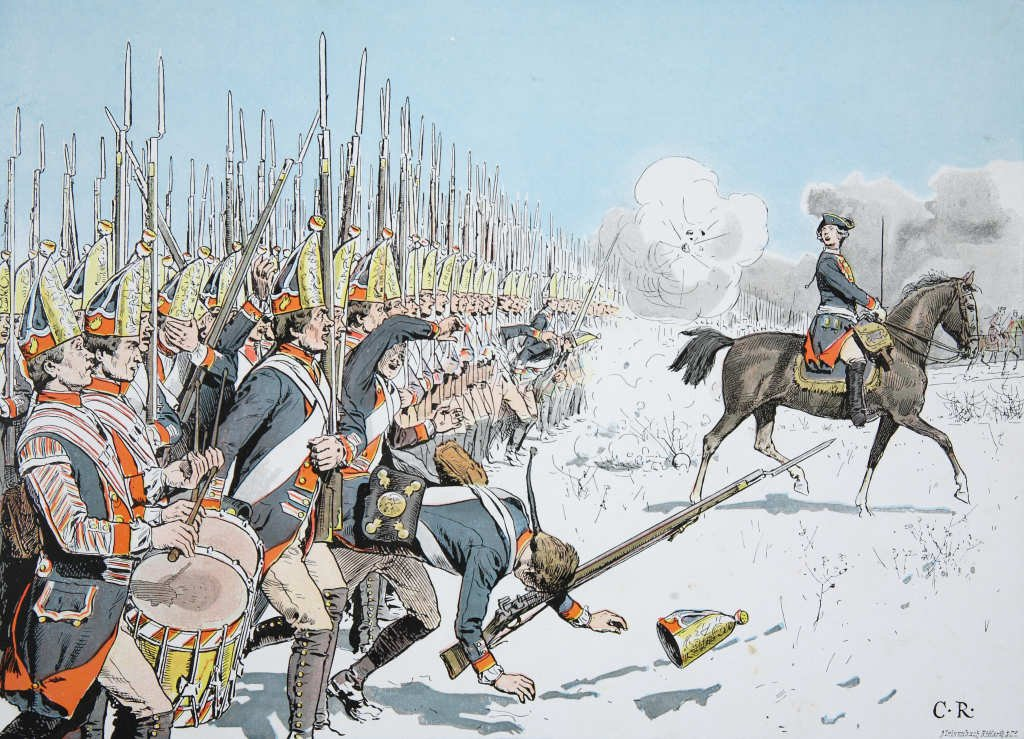
Prussians advance at Leuthen, as imagined and illustrated by Carl Röchling (c. 1890)

The Prussian infantry marched southward and remained behind a line of low hills, out of the Austrians' sight. When the heads of both superbly-drilled Prussian columns, the distances between the marching platoons remaining exactly the width of each platoon's front, had passed the Austrian left flank, the columns veered left toward the enemy and continued their march until they had passed beyond the left Austrian flank. On command, the platoons of the columns then faced left at Lobetinz, and the whole Prussian army stood in line of battle, two to three men deep, at a nearly-right angle to the weakest point of the Austrian left. Similarly, Hans Joachim von Zieten's cavalry had traversed the entire Austrian front and positioned itself at a 45-degree angle to the Austrian flank.

The Prussian artillery perched on the reverse slopes of the Butterberg and was hidden from the Austrians' view while it prepared to move to the crest to time their bombardment with the infantry's attack. The bulk of the repositioned Prussian army now faced the smallest component of the Austrian line. The only column of Prussian cavalry and the small reserve of infantry remaining at the Austrian far right continued to demonstrate in front of the Austrians and even moved further north, as if an attack would occur there.

=== Attack ===
The Austrians were astonished at the Prussian appearance on their left flank, but the objective was soon clear. The Prussian infantry, now arrayed in the conventional two lines of battle, advanced on the weakest part of the Austrian line with the intention of rolling up the flank. The Austrian colonels on the scene did their best by turning their own lines 90 degrees and trying to take advantage of a shallow ditch, which faced the Prussian line. Franz Leopold von Nádasdy, who commanded the flank, asked Charles for support, a request that was ignored. Even in the late morning, with most of the Prussian army on his left flank, he still believed that any attack would come at the northern flank. Most of the men in the first Austrian line were Württembergers, Protestant troops whose willingness to fight the Lutheran Prussians had been called into question by the Austrian command. The Württembergers held out and maintained steady musket fire until the mass of Prussians emerged through the haze of gunpowder. They then ran for their lives, sweeping the Bavarians deployed by Nádasdy to support his flank with them.

The first wave of Prussian infantry, supported by Frederick's artillery, which now pounded away from the crest of one of the hillocks, pushed steadily toward Leuthen. Commanded by Moritz of Anhalt-Dessau, the seasoned infantry and grenadiers went into battle with 60 rounds per man, according to Prussian regulation. When they overwhelmed the first Austrian line, they had already run out of ammunition. Nádasdy sent his own small cavalry against the Prussian grenadier column and its infantry support but to no avail. Nádasdy withdrew his men in chaos with his troops disarrayed. Prince Charles and Daun finally realised they had been tricked and rushed troops from the right to the left, but they had extended the front, which was originally about 4 km (2 mi) long, to almost 10 km (6 mi), when they had repositioned forces earlier that day to meet Frederick's diversion. As the Austrians withdrew, the Prussian artillery raked them with enfilade fire. The Prussian infantry and grenadiers reached Leuthen in 40 minutes and pushed the Austrian troops into the village. Prussian grenadiers breached the wall first and stormed the church, where many of the defenders were killed. Hand-to-hand fighting raged throughout the village. Charles-Joseph Lamoral, eventually Prince de Ligne, was then a captain in an Austrian regiment of foot:

Our Lieutenant-Colonel fell[,] killed almost at the first; beyond this we lost our Major, and indeed all the Officers but three.... We had crossed two successive ditches, which lay in an orchard to the left of the first houses in Leuthen; and were beginning to form in front of the village. But there was no standing of it. Besides a general cannonade such as can hardly be imagined, there was a rain of case-shot upon this Battalion, of which I, as there was no Colonel left, had to take command. (Note: For a full text of Charles-Joseph Lamoral's account, see Thomas Carlyle, History of Frederick Second, Harper, 1901. pp. 202–03.)

Leuthen was not a big village, troops were so closely packed they stood 30 to 100 ranks deep and the killing was terrible. Lamoral commented later that his battalion, usually some 1,000 strong, as well as some Hungarians and some grenadiers who had been separated from their own companies, gave him fewer than 200 men. He drew them back to the height at the edge of the village, where there was a windmill around which they could take shelter. Eventually, the Prussian Life Guards, commanded by Captain Wichard Joachim Heinrich von Möllendorf broke through the village cemetery and forced them to abandon their post.

The Austrians briefly took the advantage when they moved a battery from the ridge north of the village to cover their infantry, and the fire from the battery allowed the infantry to deploy at right angles to their original front. Frederick responded by ordering the last of his reserved left wing to advance, but the Austrian battery drove it back. Finally, Frederick's heavy cannons on the Butterberg, a small knoll to the west of town, laid down a barrage. Some participants said that barrage, more than the Prussian infantry, won the battle.

The assault on the wall briefly exposed General Wolf Frederick von Retzow's infantry line. More than two hours had elapsed since the Prince had ordered his cavalry back to Leuthen, but it arrived opportunely. Commanded by Joseph Count Lucchesi d’ Averna (Note: Lucchesi had been promoted 25 March 1741 to Generalfeldwachtmeister (master general of field guards). That is an obsolete rank above colonel and was superseded by the rank of major general. Additional promotions occurred on 5 July 1745 to lieutenant field marshal; 12 June 1754 with rank retroactive to 3 December 1748 General of the Cavalry. See Josef Wuk, Technisches polyglott-onomasticum: Oder Wörterbuch in sieben ... 1864. p. 150, entry: "Generalfeldwachmeister, V. Generalmajor" and, for biographical information, Österreichisches Staatsarchiv/A. Schmidt-Brentano, 2006 Kaiserliche und k.k. Generale (1618–1815) (PDF; 443 kB).) the cavalry hurried to take them in the flank; a successful cavalry charge at that critical moment could have turned the tide of battle. Unfortunately for the Austrians, 40 squadrons of Zieten's cavalry awaited them at Radaxdorf and charged their flank, and another 30 squadrons commanded by Georg Wilhelm von Driesen charged their front. The Bayreuth Dragoons hit the other flank; and the Puttkamer Hussars charged the rear. Lucchessi was killed by being decapitated by a cannonball, and his troopers were scattered. The cavalry mêlée soon swirled into the Austrian infantry line behind Leuthen, which caused more confusion. Overrun by the Prussian horse, the Austrian infantry broke. The infantry and then the cavalry retreated toward Breslau, where they crossed the Schweidnitzer Weistritz river, then called the "Black Water".

== Maps ==
Solid red lines indicate Habsburg positions. Solid blue lines indicate Prussian positions. Dotted lines show movement. Rectangles with a diagonal line indicate cavalry.

The Battle in Four Maps

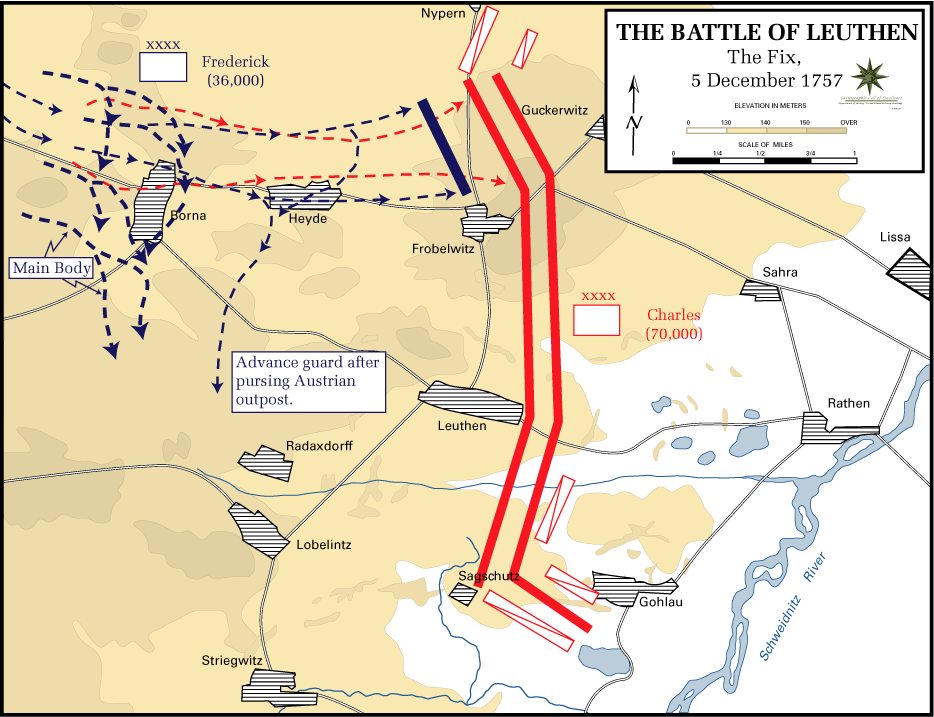
Upon Frederick's approach, Charles's advanced post (dotted red line) withdrew to Nypern. From Borne, Frederick evaluated the size and the disposition of the Austrian force (solid red line) and organised his troops for the oblique maneuver. On the far right is the village of Lissa, where Frederick ended his day.

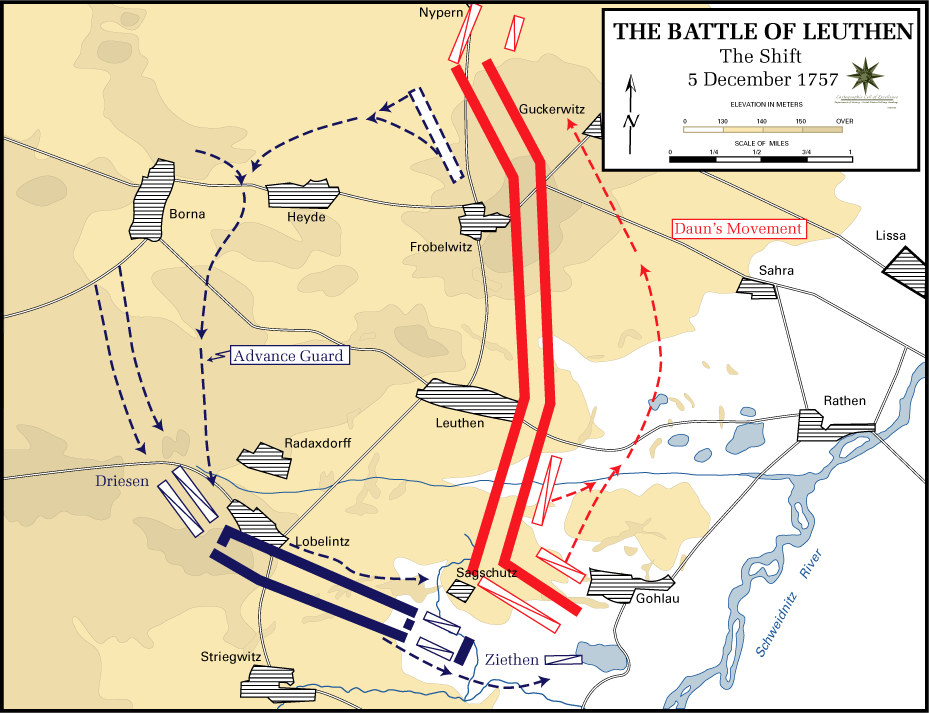
While Charles sent most of his reserve north (red dotted lines) to protect his flank from the Prussian advance, Frederick maneuvered his troops past the Austrians and surprised them on their left flank.

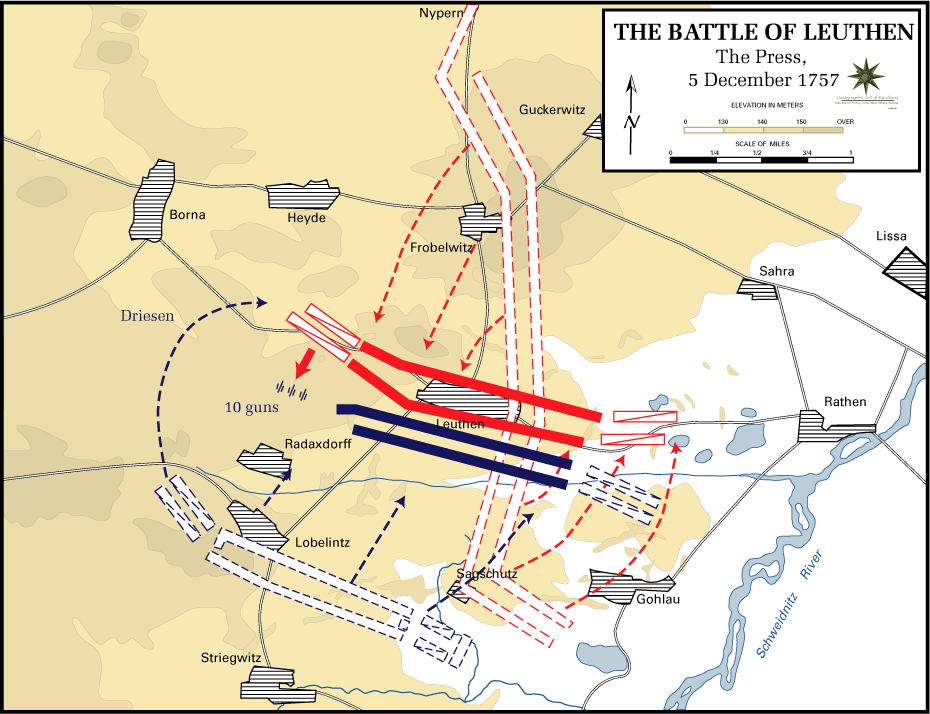
Charles finally realised his danger and tried to bring his cavalry and troops from his right flank into the fray. The length of his line (solid red) extended for 8 km (5 mi), which meant that the troops had to march too far. The Prussians (dotted blue line) pushed the Austrians back.

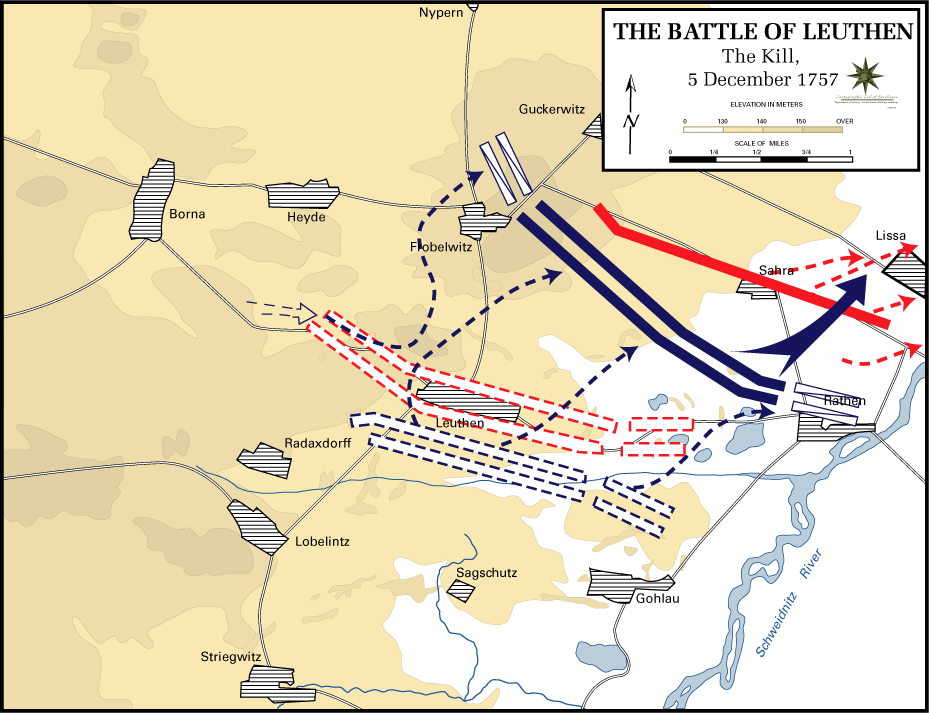
Charles' troops withdrew from the field, and Frederick entered the small castle at Lissa.

== Aftermath ==
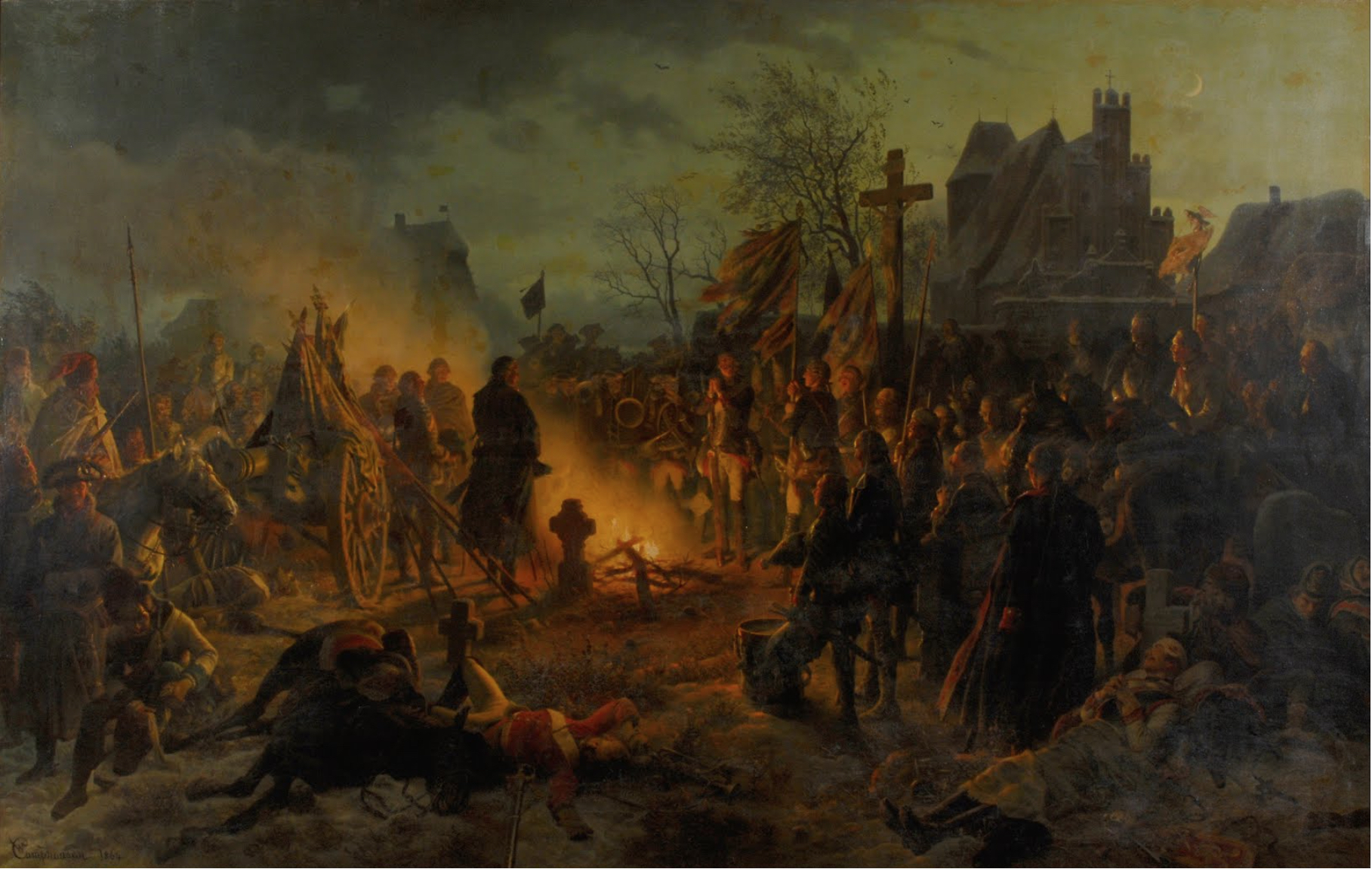
Wilhelm Camphausen's 19th-century depiction of Frederick and his troops after the battle. The troops reportedly sang Nun danket alle Gott ("Now Thank we all our God"), still known widely as the Leuthen chorale.

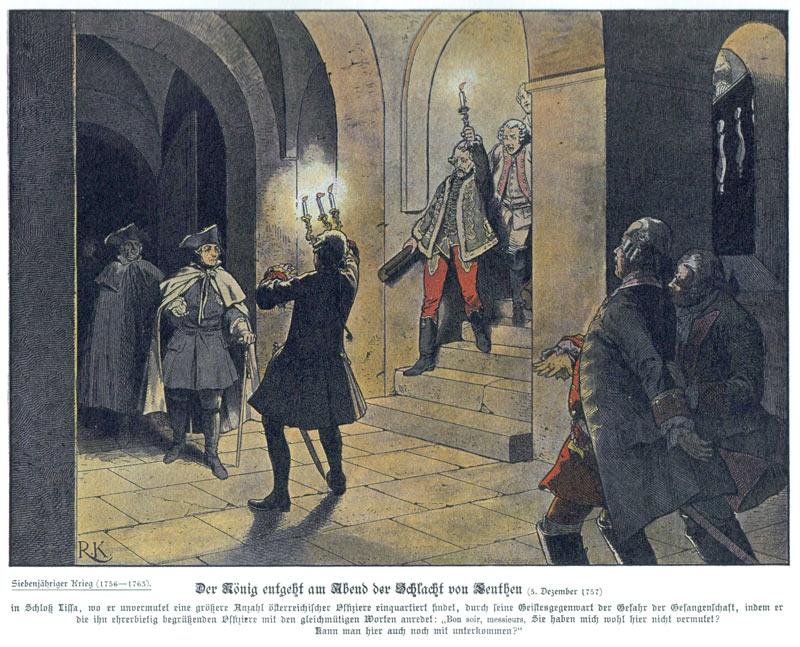
Richard Knötel's depiction of Frederick's arrival at the Schloss von Lissa after the Battle of Leuthen; he was greeted by astonished Austrian officers, the men wearing the white jackets.

As the smoke cleared, the Prussian infantry reformed its lines and prepared to pursue the fleeing Austrians. Snow began to fall, and Frederick halted the pursuit. A few soldiers, perhaps only one of them, started to sing the well-known chorale Nun danket alle Gott (Now Thank We All Our God). Eventually the entire army may have joined in the song, but that story is likely apocryphal. (Note: Modern historians and musicologists question whether or not the Prussian army indeed sang the chorale, but the story has become a legend. See (in German) Achim Hofer, "Joseph Goldes (1802–1886) Fest-Reveille (1858) über den Choral 'Nun danket alle Gott' für Militärmusik" in Peter Moormann, Albrecht Riethmüller, Rebecca Wolf eds., Paradestück Militärmusik: Beiträge zum Wandel staatlicher Repräsentation durch Musik, Transcript Verlag (2012), pp. 217–38. ISBN 978-3-8376-1655-2 and (in German) Bernhard R. Kroener, "'Nun danket alle Gott.' der Choral von Leuthen und Friedrich der Große als protestantischer Held; die Produktion politischer Mythen im 19. und 20. Jahrhundert" in Hartmut Lehmann & Gerd Krumeich eds. "Gott mit uns": Religion, Nation und Gewalt im 19. und frühen 20. Jahrhundert, Vandenhoeck & Ruprecht (2000), pp. 105–34, ISBN 978-3525354780. Regardless of its truth, certainly the officer depicted in Wilhelm Camphausen's picture was more likely to have been Moritz of Anhalt-Dessau, whose responsibility it was to conduct the cleanup operations and to settle the troops appropriately for the night.)

Frederick pushed toward Lissa. Refugees from the battle had filled the town, and he found the courtyard of the local castle crowded with startled Austrian officers. Reportedly, after the king dismounted, he addressed them politely, "Good evening, Gentlemen, I dare say you did not expect me here. Can one get a night's lodging along with you?"

After a day of rest, on 7 December, Frederick sent half his cavalry with Zieten, chasing Charles's retreating army, now heading toward Königgrätz by Schweidnitz and captured another 2,000 men and their baggage. With the rest of his army, Frederick marched on Breslau. By chasing Charles's army into Bohemia, the Prussians guaranteed the isolation of the Allied garrison holding Breslau. The Austrian general left in command of the city, Lieutenant Field Marshal Salman Sprecher von Bernegg, (Note: Salmon (also spelled Solomon, Saloman) Sprecher von Bernegg, 1697–1758, descended from the Davoser line of Sprecher von Bernegg. Some sources misidentify the commander of Breslau as Johann Andreas Sprecher von Bernegg. See Sprecher, Daniel, "Sprecher", Neue Deutsche Biographie 24 (2010), S. 745–46.) had a combined force of French and Austrian of 17,000 men. Breslau was a well-fortified city of walls and moats. The Austrians were determined to hold Breslau not only because losing it would cost them control of Silesia and considerable diminution of prestige but also because of the immense quantities of stores that the city held. The Austrian commander, recognizing his grim plight, posted placards on gallows and poles throughout the city and warned that anyone who spoke of surrender would be hanged immediately. On 7 December, Frederick laid siege to the city, and the future of Austrian control of Breslau and the region looked grim. Indeed, Breslau surrendered on 19–20 December.

=== Casualties ===
Out of an army of approximately 66,000 men, the Austrians lost 22,000, including 3,000 dead, 7,000 wounded and an astonishing 12,000 captured. Of the dead and wounded, the Austrian demographer and historian Gaston Bodart estimated that almost 5% were officers. He also placed such other losses as capture and desertion at 17,000, almost 26%. Charles lost entire regiments, which scattered in the first attacks or overrun at the end; they simply dissolved in the waves of Prussian blue coats. The Prussians also captured 51 standards and 116 of the 250 Austrian cannons. Of the Prussian army of 36,000, Frederick lost 6,344, including 1,141 dead, 5,118 wounded and 85 captured. He lost none of his artillery.

Despite the victory, its cost was high: Frederick lost one fifth of the men he had taken into battle, including two of his major generals. (Note: Lorenz Ernst von Münchow died of his injuries in January 1758; Kaspar Friedrich von Rohr was hit by a cannon ball and died at Radaxdorf 12 December 1757. See Anton Balthasar König, Lorenz Ernst von Münchow, Biographisches Lexikon aller Helden und Militairpersonen, welche sich in Preußischen Diensten berühmt gemacht haben. Band 3. Arnold Wever, Berlin 1790, S. 75, and Neue genealogisch-historische Nachrichten von den vornehmsten Begebenheiten, welche sich an den europäischen Höfen zugetragen, vol 54, Heinsius, 1759, pp. 608–09.)

The battle presented a severe blow to Austrian morale. The army had been soundly beaten by another half its size with fewer guns and tired after a long march over twelve days. Charles and his second-in-command, Count Leopold Joseph von Daun, sank "in the depths of despondency", and the prince could not fathom what had happened. Charles had a mixed-to-poor record against Frederick in past encounters, but he had never fared so badly as at Leuthen. After the crushing defeat, Maria Theresa replaced him with Daun. Charles retired from military service and later served as the governor of the Habsburg Netherlands.

== Assessments ==
Frederick had benefited from an obliging enemy. Firstly, Charles saw what he wanted to see regarding the principal attack, instead of using his efficient light cavalry to scout the Prussian movements. Frederick commented later that a lone patrol could have uncovered his plan. The cavalry that Frederick had left demonstrating in front of the northernmost position of the Austrian line was simply a diversion to hide his real movements. Secondly, the Austrians obliged him by their failure to post pickets on their unprotected flank south of Leuthen. Nádasdy's omission of outposts on his open flank south of Leuthen was a surprising oversight for an officer with his long years of experience against the Prussians. He should have considered the possibility of an attack from an unexpected place because that was Frederick's modus operandi. Thirdly, even when confronted with the attack on his left, the diversion on the right flank near Frobelwitz continued to mesmerize Charles. When he ordered cavalry to move from the north to support the faltering troops in and around Leuthen in the south, they had too far to travel in too little time.

The battle was Frederick's greatest victory so far, perhaps the greatest use of tactics in his career, and showed the superiority of Prussian infantry. In one day, Frederick had regained every advantage the Austrians had won earlier that year at Breslau and Schweidnitz and ended the Austrian attempt to reclaim Silesia. The battle became an exemplar on the use of 18th-century linear tactics. Frederick had learned valuable lessons at Battles of Prague and Kolin in which his infantry had run out of ammunition and lost the initiative. At Leuthen, ammunition wagons moved with the advancing lines of grenadiers and infantry battalions, which allowed the troops to be resupplied quickly without losing momentum. Although some infantrymen fired as many as 180 rounds, the advance never halted for lack of ammunition. The Prussian cavalry successfully protected the infantry's flanks, most notably during Nádasdy's assault on the Prussian grenadiers at Leuthen's church. The cavalry also provided tactically important charges, disrupting Austrian attempts to reform, which eventually turned the defeat into a rout. Frederick's horse artillery, which was sometimes called the flying artillery for its ability to move rapidly, maintained its fire and kept pace with the army and deployed and redeployed its guns as needed. In addition to the physical damage they wrought, the distinctive sound of the horse artillery's 12-pounder cannon, sometimes called Brummers, heightened Prussian morale and reduced that of the Austrians.

The victory changed the attitude of Frederick's enemies. Before the battle, he was often referred to in an unflattering, even demeaning, manner, but after Leuthen, he was widely called the King of Prussia in both polite and popular conversation. The victories at Leuthen and Rossbach earned Frederick respect and fear, which even his bitter enemies held for the rest of the war and the subsequent peace. Both battles probably saved Prussia from conquest by Austria. Half-a-century later, Napoleon called Leuthen "a masterpiece of movements, maneuvers and resolution".

== Memorials ==
A memorial erected in 1854 honoured the Prussian army at Leuthen. Frederick's great-great nephew, King Frederick William IV, ordered a victory column with a gilded goddess of victory at Heidau 5 km (3 mi) north-west of Leuthen. The Berlin architect Friedrich August Stüler provided the design for the monument, and Christian Daniel Rauch created the goddess of victory. The sculptor Heinrich Menzel from Neisse constructed the column in his workshop, in local white-gray stone. Moritz Geiss executed the plinth and the goddess in zinc casting and gilded the statue Victoria for a better effect. Befitting its importance in the establishment of the Prussian state and the mythos of Frederick the Great, the monument reached 20 meters (66 ft). During or after the Second World War, soldiers or partisans dynamited the monument, and only ruins of its pedestal remain, renovated in 2011.

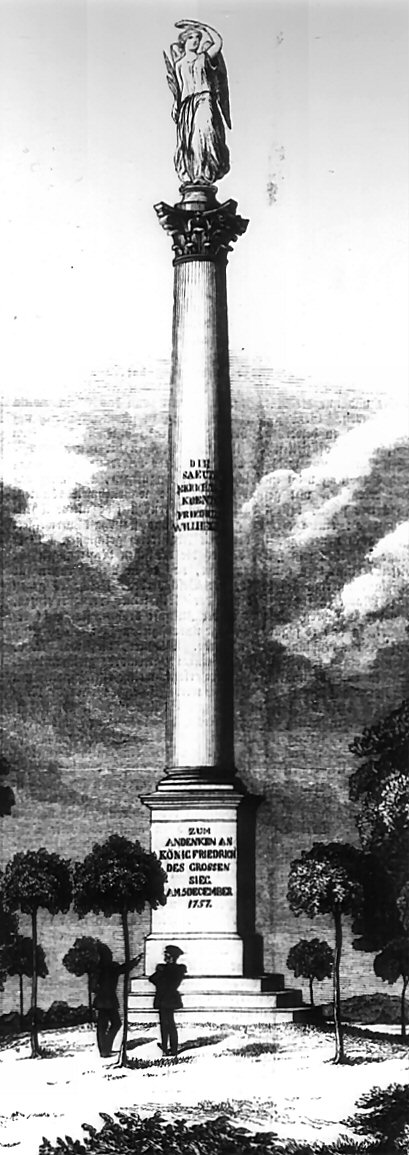
Memorial to the battle erected in 1854 and demolished in 1945

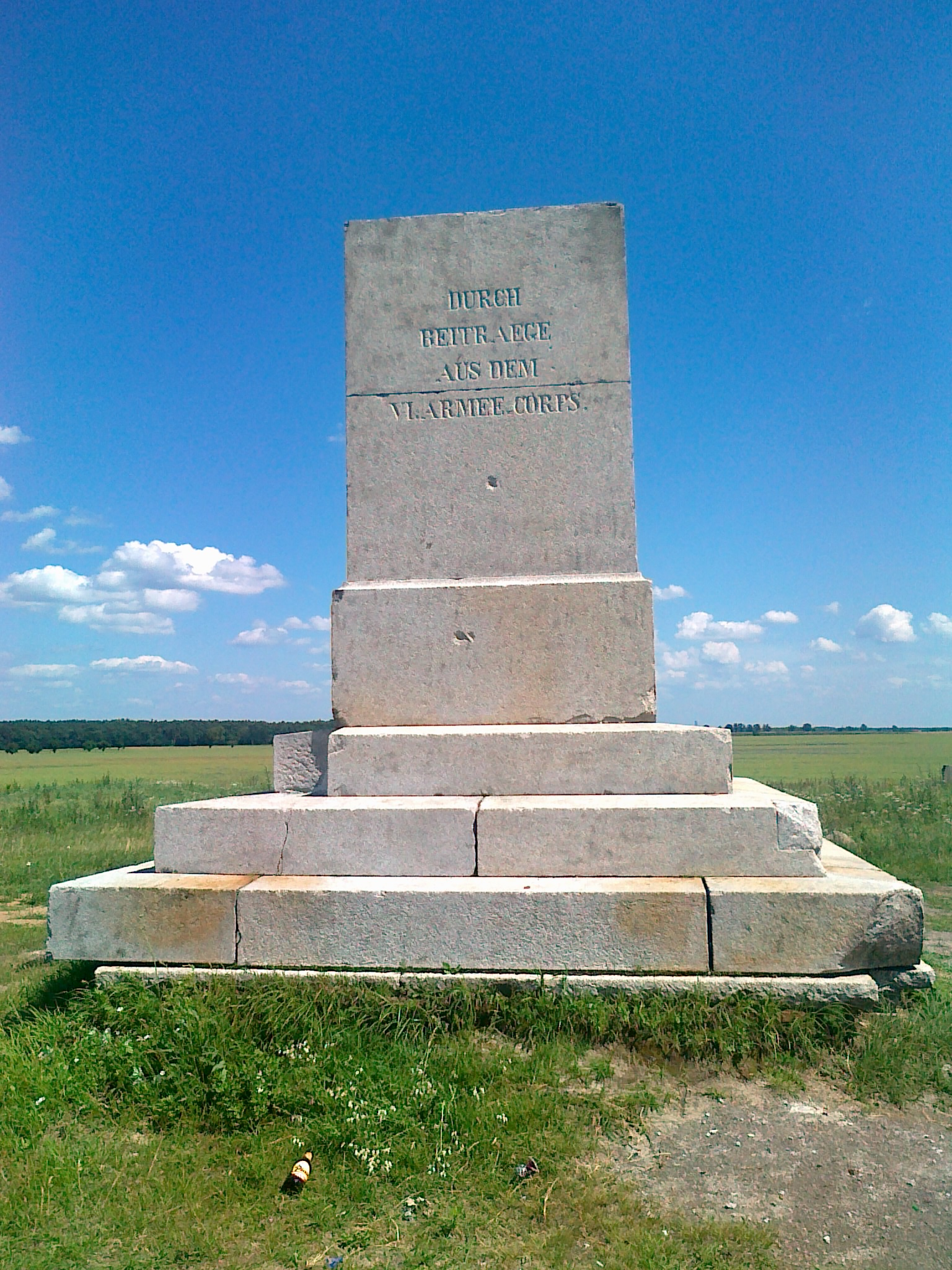
Remains of the memorial erected in 1854

== Sources ==
=== Bibliography ===
- Asprey, Robert. Frederick the Great: A Magnificent Enigma, Ticknor & Fields, 1986, ISBN 978-0-89919-352-6
- Anderson, Fred. Crucible of War: The Seven Years' War and the Fate of Empire in British North America, 1754–1766. Knopf Doubleday Publishing Group, 2007, ISBN 978-0-3074-2539-3
- Black, Jeremy. "Essay and Reflection: On the 'Old System' and the Diplomatic Revolution' of the Eighteenth Century", International History Review (1990) 12:2 pp. 301–323.
- Bodart, Gaston. Losses of Life in Modern Wars, Clarendon Press, 1916, OCLC 875334380
- Blanning, Tim. Frederick the Great, Random House, 2016, ISBN 978-1-4000-6812-8
- Carlyle, Thomas. History of Frederick Second, Harper, 1901. OCLC 832817892
- Chisholm, Hugh, ed. (1911). "Leuthen" . Encyclopædia Britannica. Vol. 16 (11th ed.). Cambridge University Press. pp. 504–505.
- Citino, Robert M., The German Way of War: From the Thirty Years War to the Third Reich. University Press of Kansas. Lawrence, KS, 2005, ISBN 978-0-7006-1410-3
- Clodfelter, M. (2017). Warfare and Armed Conflicts: A Statistical Encyclopedia of Casualty and Other Figures, 1492-2015 (4th ed.). Jefferson, North Carolina: McFarland. ISBN 978-0-7864-7470-7.
- David, Saul. War: The Definitive Visual History, Penguin, 2009. ISBN 978-0-7566-6817-4
- Duffy, Christopher, The Army of Maria Theresa, Terence Wise, 1990, ISBN 978-0-7153-7387-3
- Duffy, Christopher, The Army of Frederick the Great, Emperor Press, 1996, ISBN 978-1-883476-02-1
- Duffy, Christopher, Prussia's Glory: Rossbach and Leuthen 1757, Emperor's Press, 2003. ISBN 978-1-883476-29-8
- Fuller, J.F.C., A Military History of the Western World, Da Capo Press, 1987, ISBN 978-0-306-80305-5
- Hofer, Achim. "Joseph Goldes (1802–1886) Fest-Reveille (1858) über den Choral 'Nun danket alle Gott' für Militärmusik" in Peter Moormann, Albrecht Riethmüller, Rebecca Wolf eds., Paradestück Militärmusik: Beiträge zum Wandel staatlicher Repräsentation durch Musik (in German), Transcript Verlag (2012), pp. 217–238. ISBN 978-3-8376-1655-2
- Horn, D.B. "The Diplomatic Revolution" in J.O. Lindsay, ed., The New Cambridge Modern History vol. 7, The Old Regime: 1713–63 (1957), pp. 449–464. ISBN 978-0-521-04545-2
- Keeney, L. Douglas. The Pointblank Directive: Three Generals and the Untold Story of the Daring Plan that Saved D-Day, Bloomsbury Publishing, 2012, ISBN 978-1-7820-0895-8
- König, Anton Balthasar. Lorenz Ernst von Münchow, Biographisches Lexikon aller Helden und Militairpersonen, welche sich in Preußischen Diensten berühmt gemacht haben. (in German) Band 3. Arnold Wever, Berlin 1790, S. 75.
- Kroener, Bernhard R."'Nun danket alle Gott.' der Choral von Leuthen und Friedrich der Große als protestantischer Held; die Produktion politischer Mythen im 19. und 20. Jahrhundert" in Hartmut Lehmann & Gerd Krumeich eds. "Gott mit uns": Religion, Nation und Gewalt im 19. und frühen 20. Jahrhundert (in German), Vandenhoeck & Ruprecht (2000), pp. 105–134, ISBN 978-3525354780.
- Kosmala, Gerard. Geographical Characteristics of Silesia, Academy of Physical Education in Katowice, 2015
- Latimer, Jon, Deception in War, London: John Murray, 2001. ISBN 978-0-7195-5605-0
- Leipziger Illustrirte Zeitung. (in German) No. 593. 11 November 1854.
- Moorhouse, Roger. "The Historian at Large: The Forgotten Battlefield at Leuthen". 5 December 2014 version. Accessed 7 February 2017.
- Neue genealogisch-historische Nachrichten von den vornehmsten Begebenheiten, welche sich an den europäischen Höfen zugetragen (in German), vol. 54, Heinsius, 1759, pp. 608–609
- The New York Times. "Silesia; Geography". 23 December 1981.
- O'Brien, Cormac, Outnumbered: Incredible Stories of History's Most Surprising Battlefield Upsets, Fair Winds Press, 2010, ISBN 978-1-61673-843-3
- Overy, Richard. A History of War in 100 Battles, Oxford University Press, 2014, ISBN 978-0-19-939071-7
- Redman, Herbert J. Frederick the Great and the Seven Years' War, 1756–1763, McFarland, 2014, ISBN 978-0-7864-7669-5
- Showalter, Dennis E. (2007). The Early Modern World: Soldiers' Lives. Greenwood Publishing. ISBN 978-0-313-33312-5.
- Sprecher, Daniel. "Sprecher", Neue Deutsche Biographie (in German) 24 (2010), S. 745–746.
- Sprecher, Salomon, von Bernegg. Diarium der Belagerung von Breslau; und Capitulations-Puncte von der Übergabe an Se. Königl. Majestät in Prüssen: Nebst einem Verzeichniß mit Nahmen, derer Generals, Staabs-Officiers und andern Officiers, dann vom Feldwebel an summariter derer Kayserl. Königl. Truppen, so den 21ten December 1757. (in German) Berlin, 1758, OCLC 634835920
- Tucker, Spencer. Battles that Changed History: An Encyclopedia of World Conflict. ABC-CLIO, 2010, ISBN 978-1-59884-429-0
- Wilson, Peter H. The Heart of Europe: A History of the Holy Roman Empire. Penguin Publishing, 2016, ISBN 978-0-6740-5809-5
