= Cormac O'Brien (author) =

American author (born 1967)

Cormac O'Brien (born 1967) is an American author.

O'Brien is most famous for three books: Secret Lives of the U.S. Presidents and Secret Lives of the First Ladies.
