= Prince Charles Alexander of Lorraine =

Austrian army officer and governor of the Austrian Netherlands (1712–1780)

Prince Charles Alexander
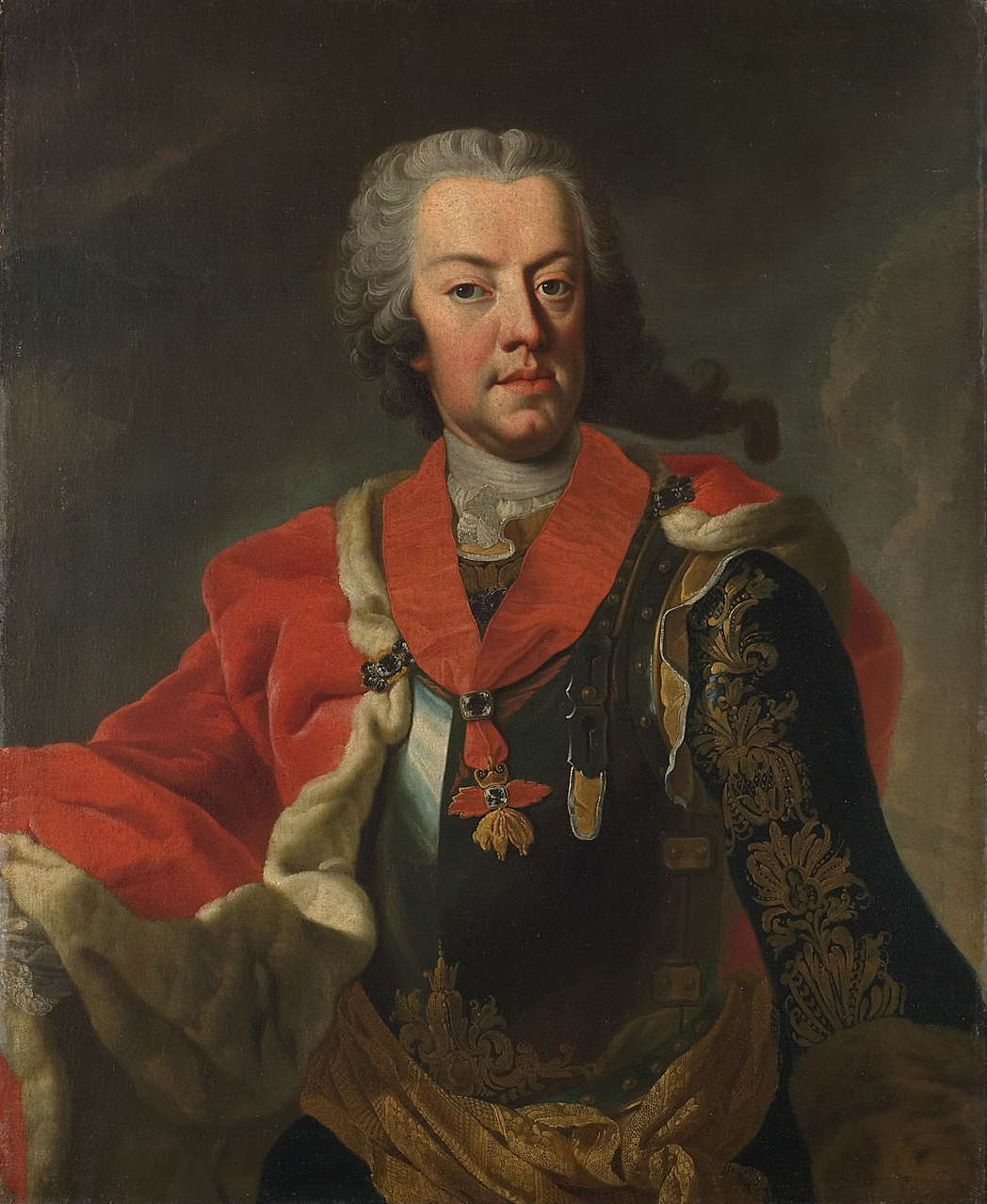
- Portrait by Martin van Meytens, c. 1743

Governor of the Austrian Netherlands
- Tenure: 8 January 1744 – 4 July 1780
- Predecessor: Archduchess Maria Anna of Austria
- Successor: Maria Christina and Albert Casimir

Grand Master of the Teutonic Order
- Reign: 1761 – 4 July 1780
- Predecessor: Clemens August of Bavaria
- Successor: Archduke Maximilian Francis of Austria
- Born: 12 December 1712; Lunéville, Duchy of Lorraine, Holy Roman Empire
- Died: 4 July 1780 (aged 67); Tervuren, Duchy of Brabant, Holy Roman Empire
- Spouse: Archduchess Maria Anna of Austria (m. 1744; died 1744)
Names
- Charles Alexandre Emanuel de Lorraine
- House: Lorraine
- Father: Leopold, Duke of Lorraine
- Mother: Élisabeth Charlotte d'Orléans

Prince Charles Alexander Emanuel of Lorraine (French: Charles Alexandre Emanuel, Prince de Lorraine; German: Karl Alexander von Lothringen und Bar; 12 December 1712 in Lunéville – 4 July 1780 in Tervuren) was a Lorraine-born Austrian general and soldier, field marshal of the Imperial Army, and governor of the Austrian Netherlands.

== Early life ==
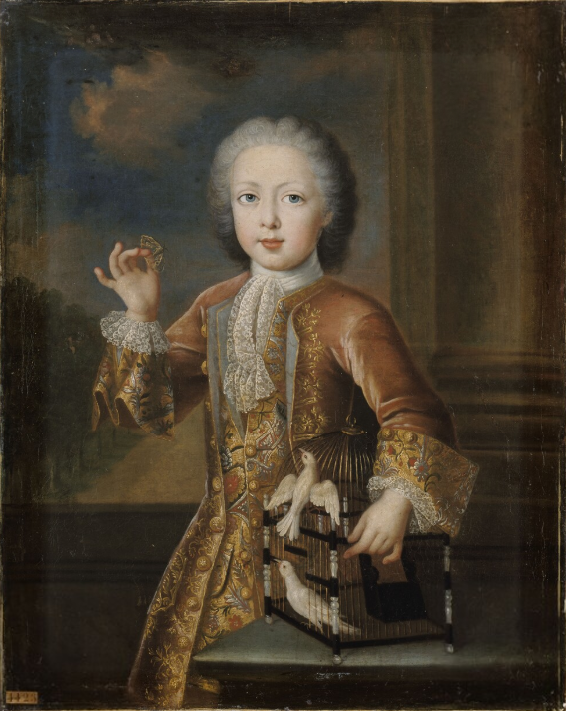
Portrait of Prince Charles Alexander as a young boy. Painted by Pierre Gobert, c. 1720

Charles was the son of Leopold, Duke of Lorraine, and Élisabeth Charlotte d'Orléans. When his elder brother Francis III, Duke of Lorraine, married the Archduchess Maria Theresa, eldest daughter of Emperor Charles VI, Charles Alexander entered the Imperial service in 1737.

When his brother Francis traded the Duchy of Lorraine to the ex-Polish king Stanisław Leszczyński in exchange for the Grand Duchy of Tuscany as one of the terms ending the War of the Polish Succession in November 1738, the ducal title to Lorraine and Bar passed beyond Charles to King Louis XV of France upon Leszczynski's death in 1766, though Francis and his successors retained the right to style themselves as dukes of Lorraine and Bar.

On 7 January 1744 he married Maria Theresa's only sister, Archduchess Maria Anna of Austria, thus making him doubly Maria Theresa's brother-in-law. The couple were jointly made Governors of the Austrian Netherlands (now Belgium).

Although Maria Anna died later the same year after marriage, Charles' popularity and lack of clear replacement allowed him to continue as governor and de facto sovereign until his own death in 1780. Charles also became Grand Master of the Teutonic Order in 1761.

During the War of the Austrian Succession, he was one of the principal Austrian military commanders. He was most notable for his defeats by better trained and superior forces under Frederick the Great. At the Battle of Chotusitz in 1742, his forces lost the battle but were able to inflict greater loss of life and retreat in good order. However, he lost more decisively to Frederick at the Battle of Hohenfriedberg and the Battle of Soor in 1745. He was also defeated by Maurice de Saxe at the Battle of Rocoux in 1746.

== Seven Years' War ==
Despite his record of defeats, he was able to retain his position. He was able to attain command ahead of the more popular Marshal Browne because of the support of his brother who had significant influence over military appointments. During Austria's Third Silesian War against Prussia (part of the wider Seven Years' War), he commanded the Imperial Army at the Battle of Prague, where he was again defeated by Frederick the Great, king in Prussia, but was able to inflict heavy casualties on the larger Prussian forces. He subsequently defeated a much smaller Prussian army in 1757 at the Battle of Breslau before being completely routed by Frederick the Great at the Battle of Leuthen, which is considered one of Frederick's most brilliant victories. During the battle, he was commander of the Imperial Army as appointed by Maria Theresa.

At Leuthen, the Austrians were overwhelmingly defeated by an army half their size, with fewer guns, and tired after a long march over 12 days. Charles and his second in command, Count Leopold Joseph von Daun, sank "in the depths of despondency", and the Prince could not fathom what had happened. Charles had a mixed record against Frederick in past encounters but had never fared so badly as at Leuthen. After this crushing defeat, Maria Theresa replaced him with Daun; Charles retired from military service and subsequently served as the governor of the Austrian Netherlands. Though an unsuccessful military leader, Charles proved to be a competent administrator, well-liked by the population. Under him, the Austrian Netherlands flourished, and he was deeply involved in the cultural life of his province.

== Family and private life ==
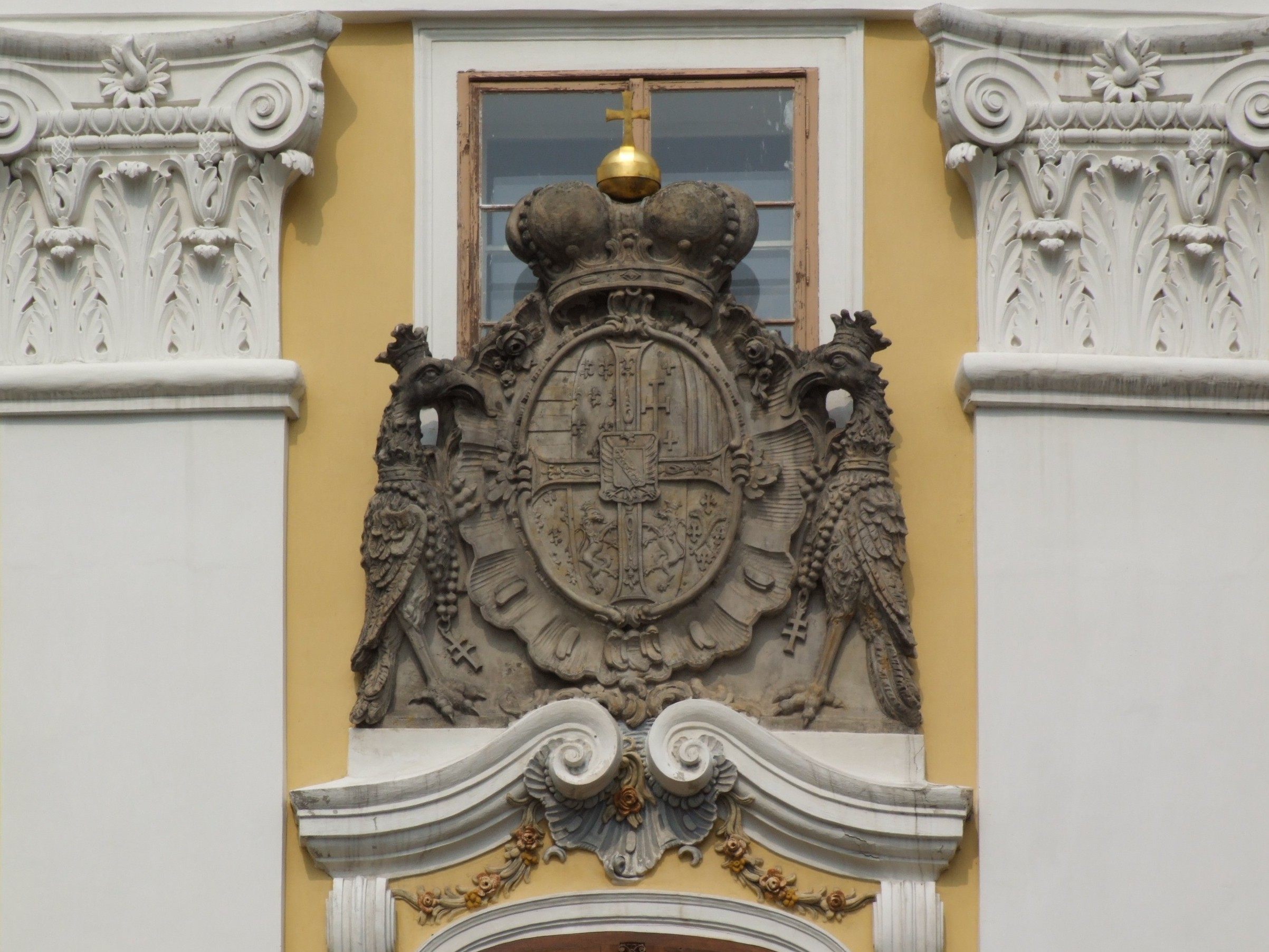
Coat of arms of Charles Alexander as Grand Master of the Teutonic Order

Because Charles ruled by right of his marriage to Maria Anna of Austria, Maria Anna's death very shortly after marriage created a situation in which his mistress Elisabeth de Vaux and their children had to be kept secret. His children were to present themselves only under the surnames of their mothers in public if they were in the Netherlands.

Though there is obscurity about his private affairs after the death of Maria Anna, it is known that from his mistress Elisabeth de Vaux, Charles had a son, Charles Alexandre Guillaume Joseph, and a grandson through the same; a stillborn daughter by an unnamed mistress; a son, Charles Frédéric, by an unnamed mistress; a son, Jean Nicholas, and a daughter, Anne Françoise, by an unnamed mistress. With his mistress Regina Elisabeth Bartholotti von Porthenfeld (b.1725) he had a daughter, Maria Regina Johanna von Merey, later Baroness von Hackelberg-Landau (1744-1779). Some of his children were known to have lived in Dutch-speaking parts of Belgium temporarily or permanently. This included his first son Charles Alexandre Guillaume Joseph, who was later known to have returned to Lunéville in Lorraine to claim a substantial inheritance, and to have a son named Gustav Auguste in 1788. He died in Nancy.

== Architecture ==
He had the Château de la Favorite (Lunéville) constructed as his retreat.

In Brussels, he had constructed the Palace of Charles of Lorraine. Also, he renovated Tervuren castle and the Château of Mariemont. Further, he commissioned the Château Charles in Tervuren.

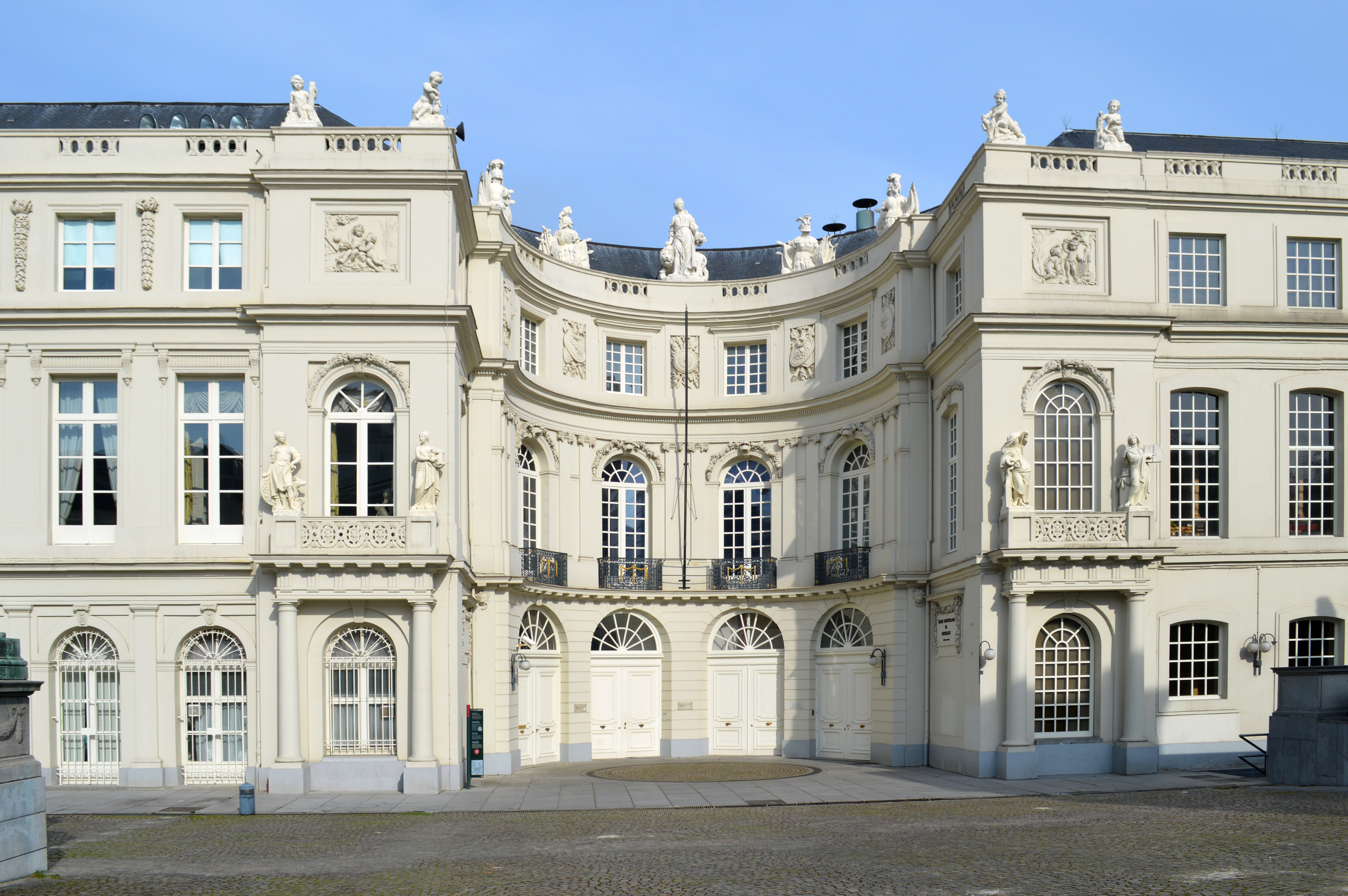
The Palace of Charles of Lorraine in Brussels

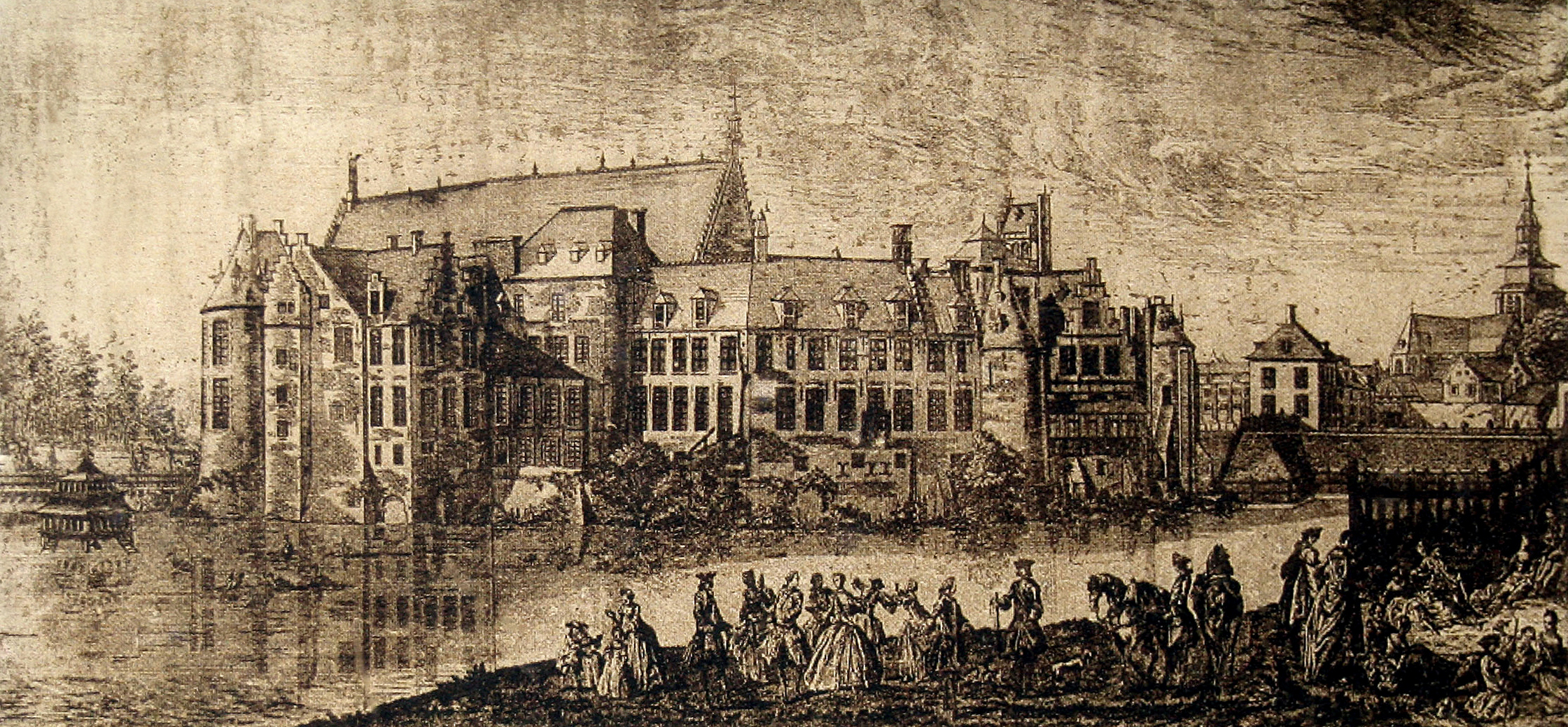
Tervuren castle

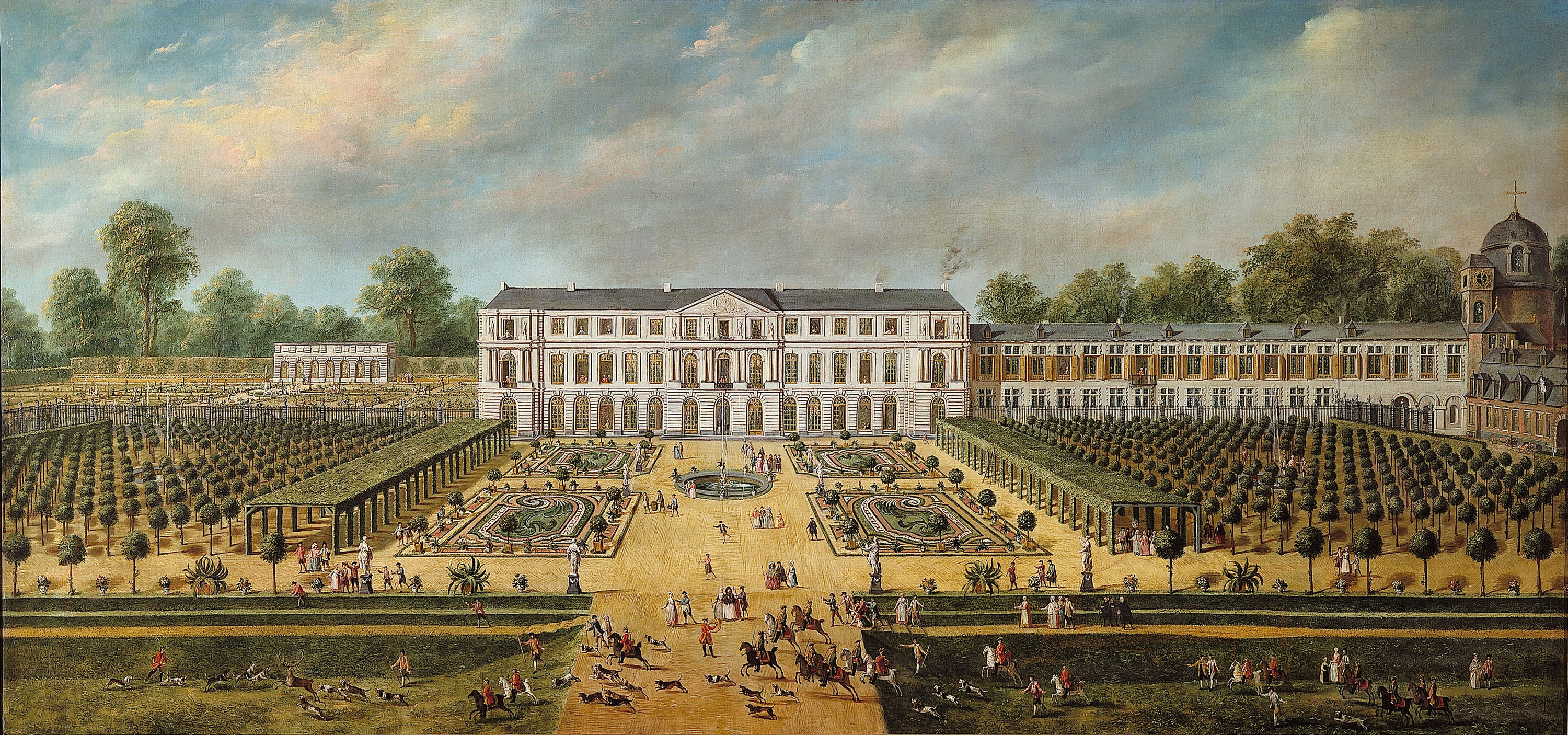
Château of Mariemont

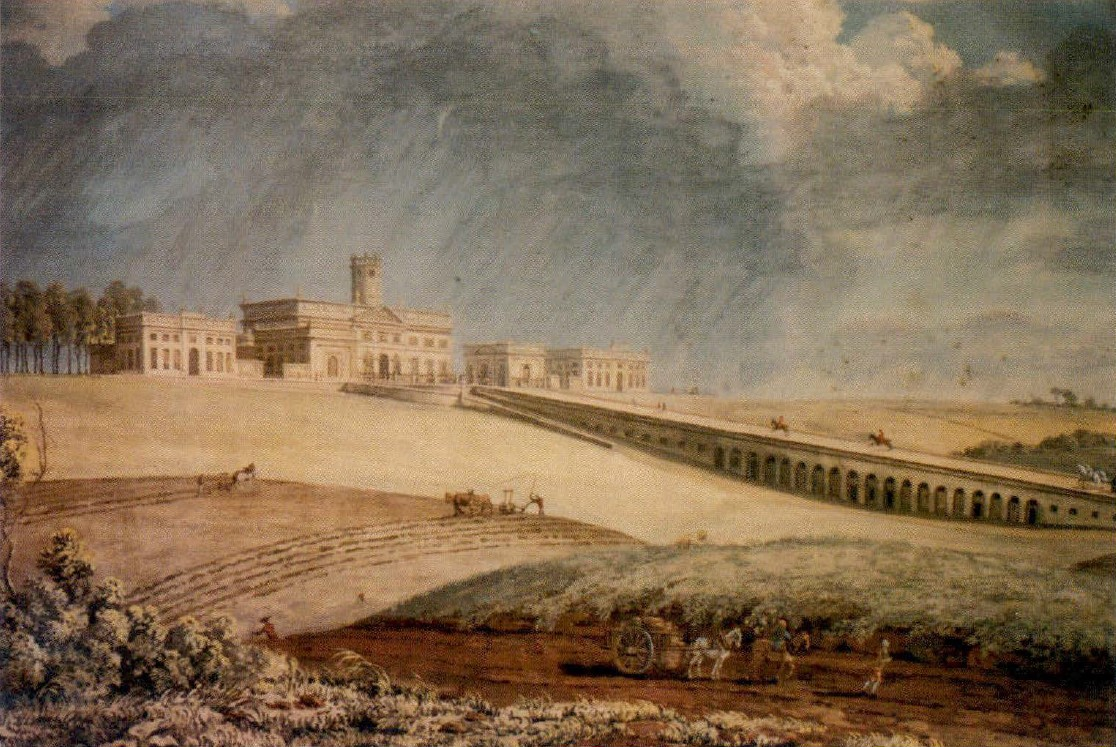
Château Charles in Tervuren

== Ancestry ==
Ancestors of Prince Charles Alexander of Lorraine

8. Nicholas II, Duke of Lorraine
4. Charles V, Duke of Lorraine
9. Claude Françoise of Lorraine
2. Léopold I, Duke of Lorraine
10. Ferdinand III, Holy Roman Emperor
5. Eleanor of Austria
11. Eleonora Gonzaga
1. Prince Charles Alexander of Lorraine
12. Louis XIII of France
6. Philippe of France, Duke of Orléans
13. Anne of Austria
3. Élisabeth Charlotte d'Orléans
14. Charles I Louis, Elector Palatine
7. Elisabeth Charlotte of the Palatinate
15. Charlotte of Hesse-Kassel

Prince Charles Alexander of Lorraine House of Lorraine Born: 12 December 1712 in Lunéville Died: 4 July 1780 in Tervuren
Government offices
Preceded by Count Friedrich August von Harrach-Rohrau	Governor of the Austrian Netherlands; 1744–80	Succeeded by Archduchess Maria Christina of Austria and Albert Casimir, Duke of Teschen
Catholic Church titles
Preceded by Clemens August of Bavaria, Prince-Archbishop-Elector of Cologne	Grand Master of the Teutonic Order; 1761–80	Succeeded by Archduke Maximilian Francis of Austria, Prince-Archbishop-Elector of Cologne
