= Leopold Joseph von Daun =

Austrian army officer (1705–1766)

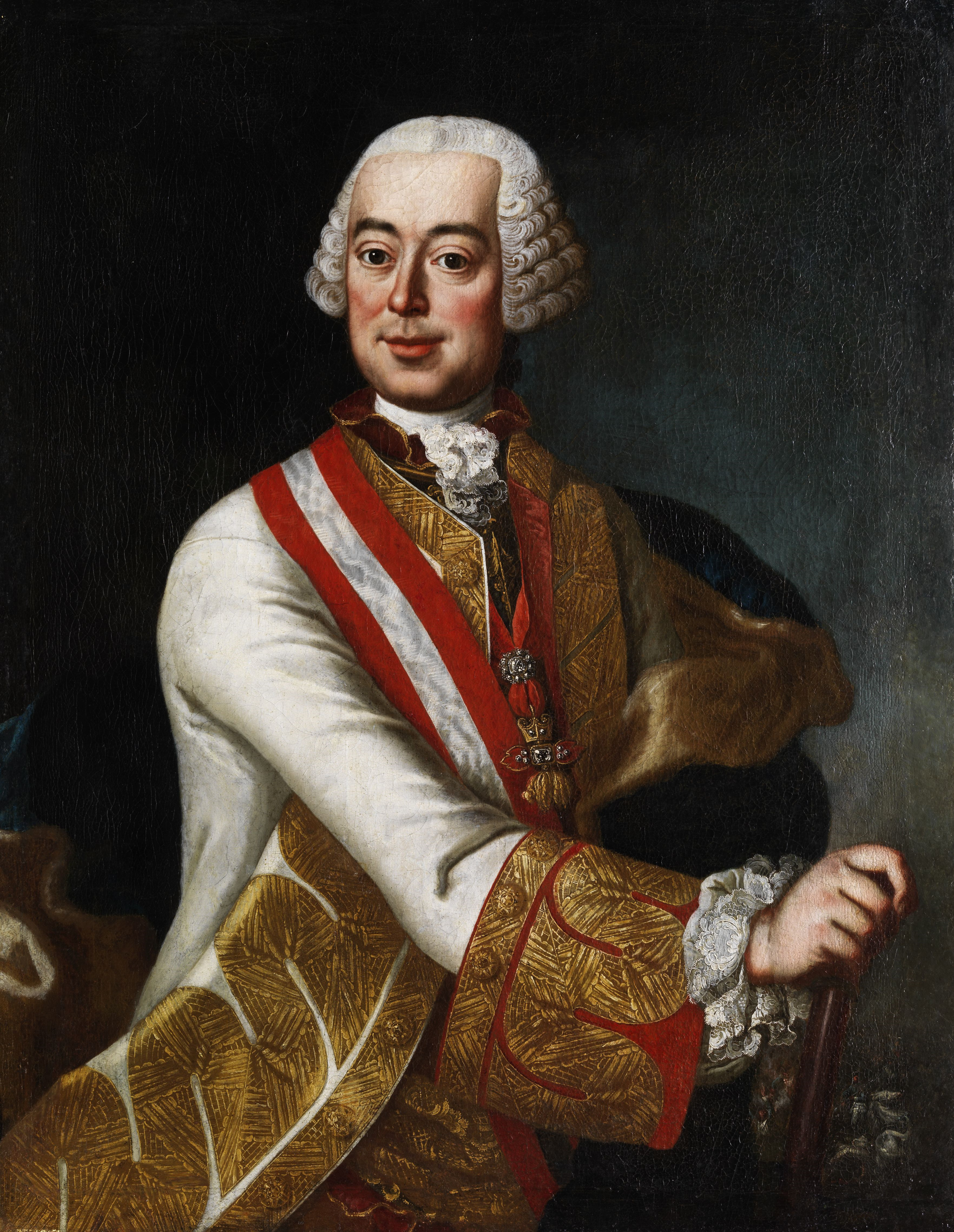
- Portrait of Daun potentially by Martin van Meytens
- Born: 24 September 1705; Vienna, Austria
- Died: 5 February 1766 (aged 60); Vienna
- Military career
- Allegiance: Holy Roman Empire
- Branch: Imperial Army
- Service years: 1718–1766
- Rank: Generalfeldmarschall
- Conflicts: War of the Quadruple Alliance; War of the Polish Succession; Russo-Austrian-Turkish War; War of the Austrian Succession; Battle of Chotusitz; Battle of Hohenfriedberg; Battle of Soor; Battle of Lauffeld; Seven Years' War; Battle of Kolín; Battle of Breslau; Battle of Leuthen; Battle of Hochkirch; Battle of Maxen; Battle of Torgau; Battle of Burkersdorf

Count Leopold Joseph von Daun (German: Leopold Joseph Maria, Reichsgraf von und zu Daun; 24 September 1705 – 5 February 1766), later Prince of Thiano, was an Austrian field marshal of the Imperial Army in the War of the Austrian Succession and Seven Years' War. Daun is considered one of the outstanding military leaders from his time.

== Early years ==
Leopold Joseph Maria was born at Vienna, the son of Count Wirich Philipp von Daun (1669–1741) and his wife, Countess Maria Barbara von Herberstein (1675–1735). The Daun noble family originated from the Rhineland and derived its name from the ancestral seat at Daun south of the High Eifel range. He was first cousin of Countess Eleonora Ernestina von Daun, who later married the Marquis of Pombal, the noted Portuguese statesman.

He was intended for the church, but his natural inclination for the army, in which his father and grandfather had been distinguished generals, proved irresistible. In 1718 he served in the War of the Quadruple Alliance in Sicily, in his father's regiment. He had already risen to the rank of Oberst (Colonel) when he saw further active service in Italy and on the Rhine in the War of the Polish Succession (1734–35). He continued to add to his distinctions in the Turkish War of 1737–39, in which he attained the rank of Feldmarschallleutnant (Major-General).

== War of the Austrian Succession ==
In the War of the Austrian Succession from 1740, Daun distinguished himself by the careful leadership which was afterwards his greatest military quality.

In Austria's First Silesian War against Prussia, he was present at Chotusitz and Prague, and led the advanced guard of Ludwig Andreas Khevenhüller's army in the victorious Danube campaign of 1743. Field Marshal Count Traun, who succeeded Khevenhüller in 1744, thought equally highly of Daun, and entrusted him with the rearguard of the Austrian army when it escaped from the French to attack Frederick the Great. He held important commands in the battles of Hohenfriedberg and Soor, and in the same year (1745) was promoted to the rank of Feldzeugmeister (Lieutenant General). After this he served in the Low Countries, and was present at the Battle of Val. He was highly valued by Maria Theresa, who made him commandant of Vienna and a Knight of the Golden Fleece, and in 1754 he was elevated to the rank of Feldmarschall (Field-Marshal).

== Seven Years' War ==
During the interval of peace that preceded the Seven Years' War he was engaged in carrying out an elaborate scheme for the reorganization of the Austrian army, and it was chiefly through his efforts that the Theresian Military Academy was established at Wiener-Neustadt in 1751. When a Third Silesian War broke out, he was not actively employed in the first campaigns of the war, but in 1757 he was placed at the head of the army which was raised to relieve Prague. On 18 June 1757 Daun decisively defeated Frederick for the first time in his career in the desperately fought Battle of Kolin. In commemoration of this brilliant exploit, the Queen immediately instituted a military order bearing her name, and Daun was awarded the first Grand Cross of that order. The union of the relieving army with the forces of Prince Charles Alexander of Lorraine at Prague reduced Daun to the position of second in command, and in that capacity he took part in the pursuit of the Prussians and the victory of Breslau.

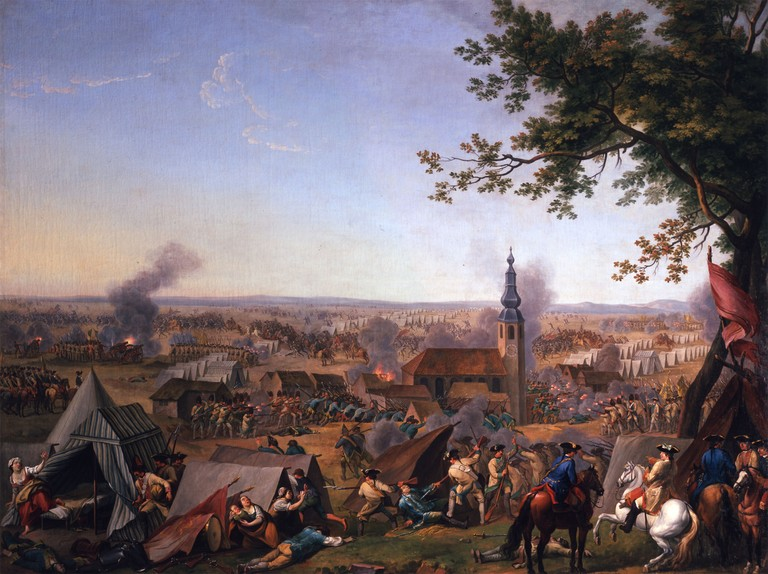
The Raid at Hochkirch on 17 October 1758 by Hyacinth de La Pegna

Frederick now reappeared and won the most brilliant victory of the age at Leuthen. Daun was present on that field, but was not blamed for the disaster, and when Prince Charles resigned his command, Daun was appointed in his place. With the campaign of 1758 began the war of manoeuvre in which Daun, though missing some opportunities to crush the Prussians through over-caution, at least maintained a steady and cool resistance to the fiery strategy of Frederick. In 1758 Major-General Ernst Gideon von Laudon, acting under Daun's instructions, forced the King to raise the siege of Olmütz (Battle of Domstadtl), and later in the same year Daun himself surprised Frederick at the Battle of Hochkirch and inflicted a severe defeat upon him (14 October). Despite the tactical success and capture of many munitions and supplies that Daun achieved at Hochkirch, his failure to pursue Frederick through the densely wooded area allowed the Prussians to block his path into Silesia, meaning that his victory counted for little. In the following year the war of manoeuvre continued, and on 20 and 21 November he surrounded the entire corps of General Friedrich August von Finck at Maxen, forcing the Prussians to surrender. These successes were counterbalanced in the following year by the defeat of Laudon at Liegnitz, which was attributed partly to the dilatoriness of Daun, and Daun's own subsequent defeat by Hans Joachim von Zieten's bold attack in the great Battle of Torgau. In this engagement, Daun was so severely wounded that he had to return to Vienna to recuperate. However, Daun and his forces inflicted heavy casualties on the Prussians and were able to retreat in good order.

== Reception ==
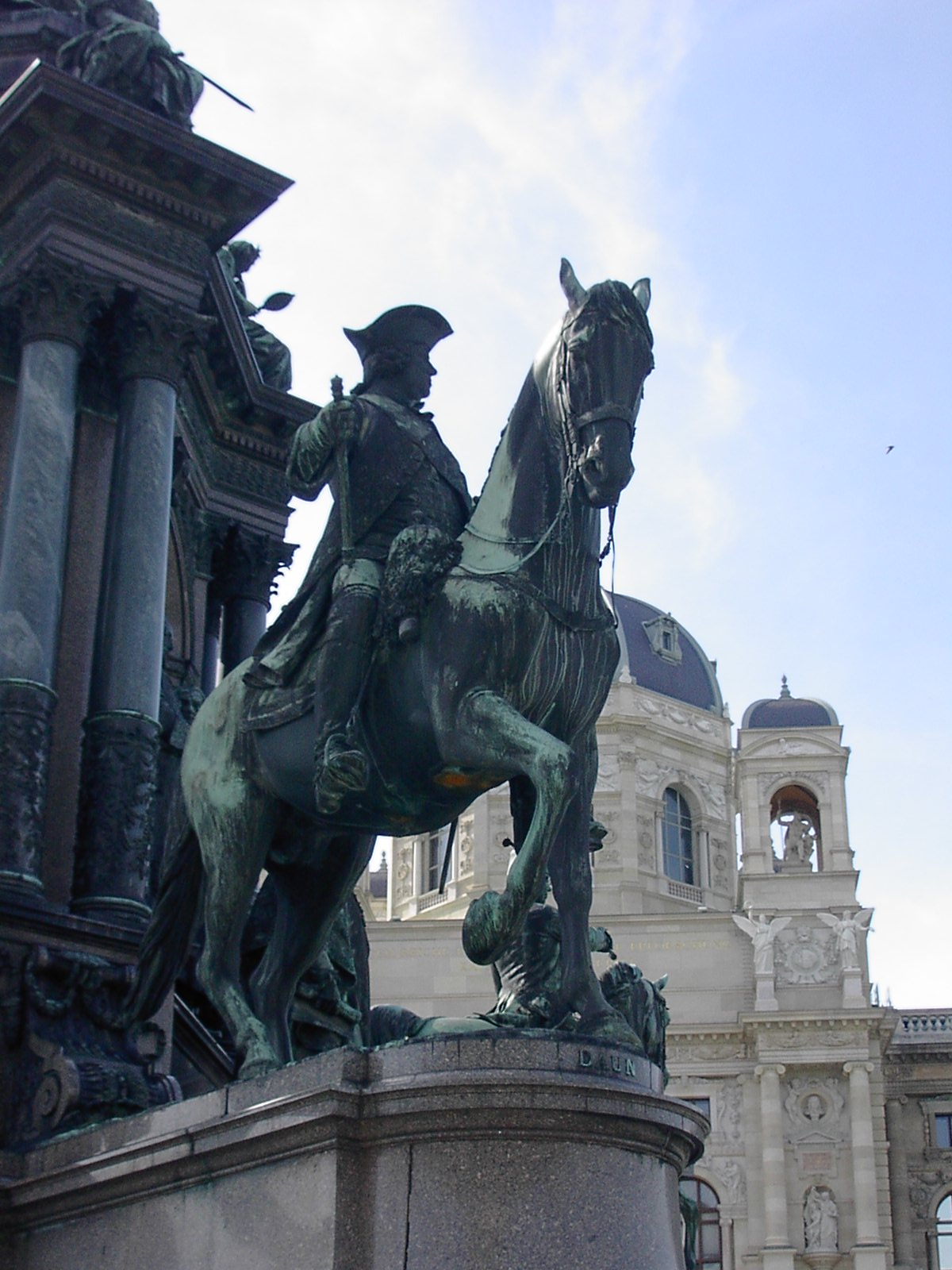
Statue of Leopold Josef Graf Daun, on the Maria Theresa memorial, Vienna

Daun continued to command until the end of the war, and afterwards worked with the greatest energy at the reorganization of the imperial forces. In 1762 he had been appointed president of the Hofkriegsrat. By order of Maria Theresa, a monument to his memory was erected by Balthasar Ferdinand Moll in the church of the Augustinians, with an inscription describing him as the "saviour of her states." In 1888, the 56th Regiment of Austrian Infantry was named after him.

Called the Austrian Fabius Cunctator, Daun has been criticized for the dilatoriness of his operations, but wariness was not misplaced when one faced a general like Frederick, who was quick and unpredictable. His inability to exploit a victory, on the other hand, might not be so easily excused. The relationship with his daring general Ernst Gideon von Laudon remained tense.

== Personal life ==
He was married to Countess Maria Josepha Fuchs vom Bimbach und Dornheim (1711–1764), widowed Countess von Nostitz-Rieneck. They had:

- Countess Maria Theresia von Daun (1745–1777), married Count Leopold Pálffy von Erdöd (1739–1799); had issue
- Count Franz Karl von Daun (1746–1771), married Princess Maria Franziska von Auersperg (1745–1818); had issue
