= Lutynia, Gmina Miękinia =

Lutynia
- Village
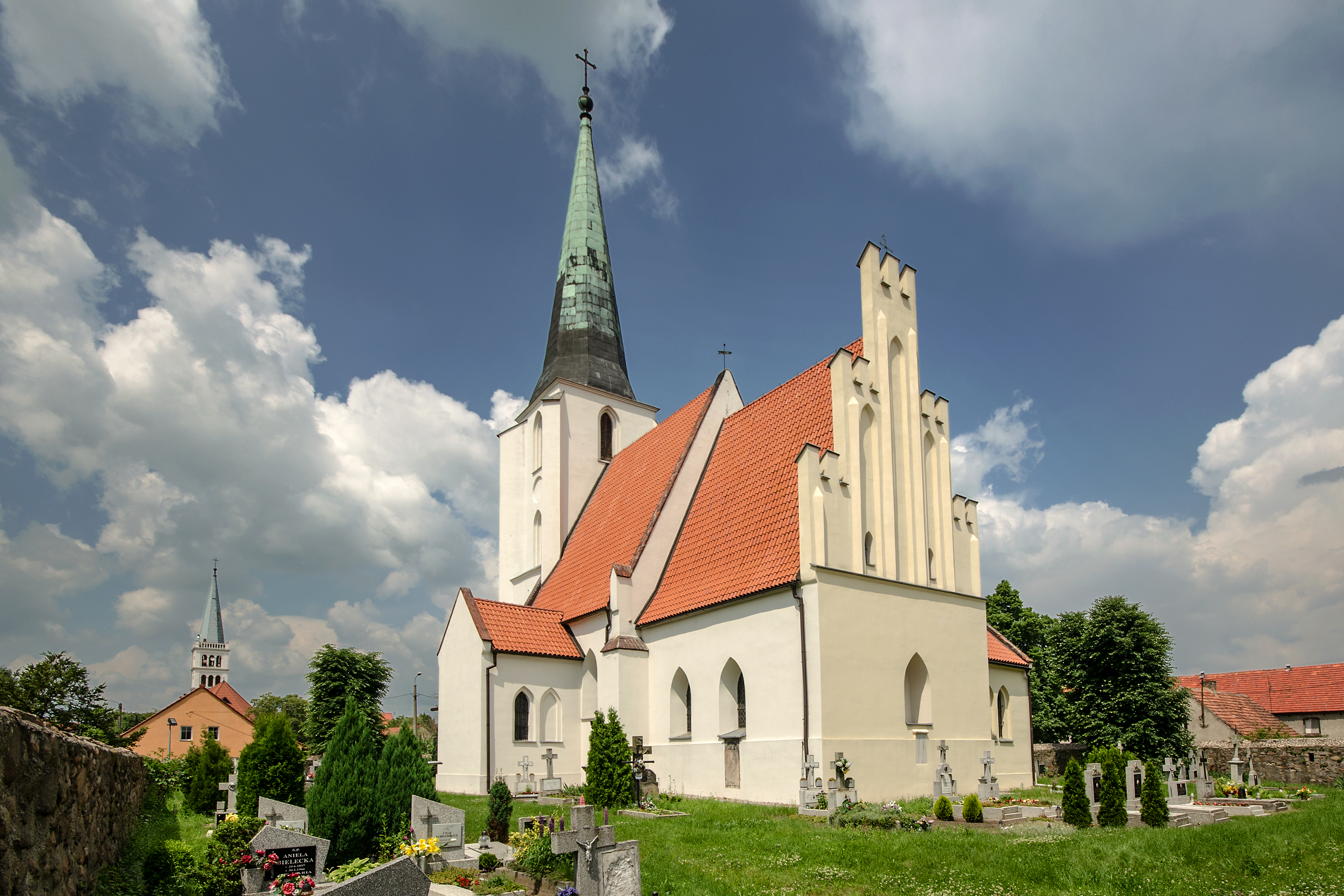
- Saint Joseph's Church

- Location within Poland
- Coordinates: 51°8′N 16°48′E
- Country: Poland
- Voivodeship: Lower Silesian
- County: Środa
- Gmina: Miękinia
- Population: 1,500
- Time zone: UTC+1 (CET)
  - Summer (DST): UTC+2 (CEST)
- Vehicle registration: DSR

Lutynia [luˈtɨɲa] (German: Leuthen) is a village in the administrative district of Gmina Miękinia, within Środa County, Lower Silesian Voivodeship, in south-western Poland.

== History ==
The area became part of the emerging Polish state in the 10th century, and centuries later, it also was part of Bohemia, Hungary, the Habsburg monarchy, Prussia and Germany. It is the site of the Battle of Leuthen, where Frederick the Great of Prussia inflicted a heavy defeat on the Austrians on 5 December 1757. Following the defeat of Germany in World War II, the village became again part of Poland.

== Bibliography ==
- Reynolds, Francis J., ed. (1921). "Leuthen" . Collier's New Encyclopedia. New York: P. F. Collier & Son Company.
- Wood, James, ed. (1907). "Leuthen" . The Nuttall Encyclopædia. London and New York: Frederick Warne.
