= Château Charles =

Demolished palace in Tervuren, Belgium

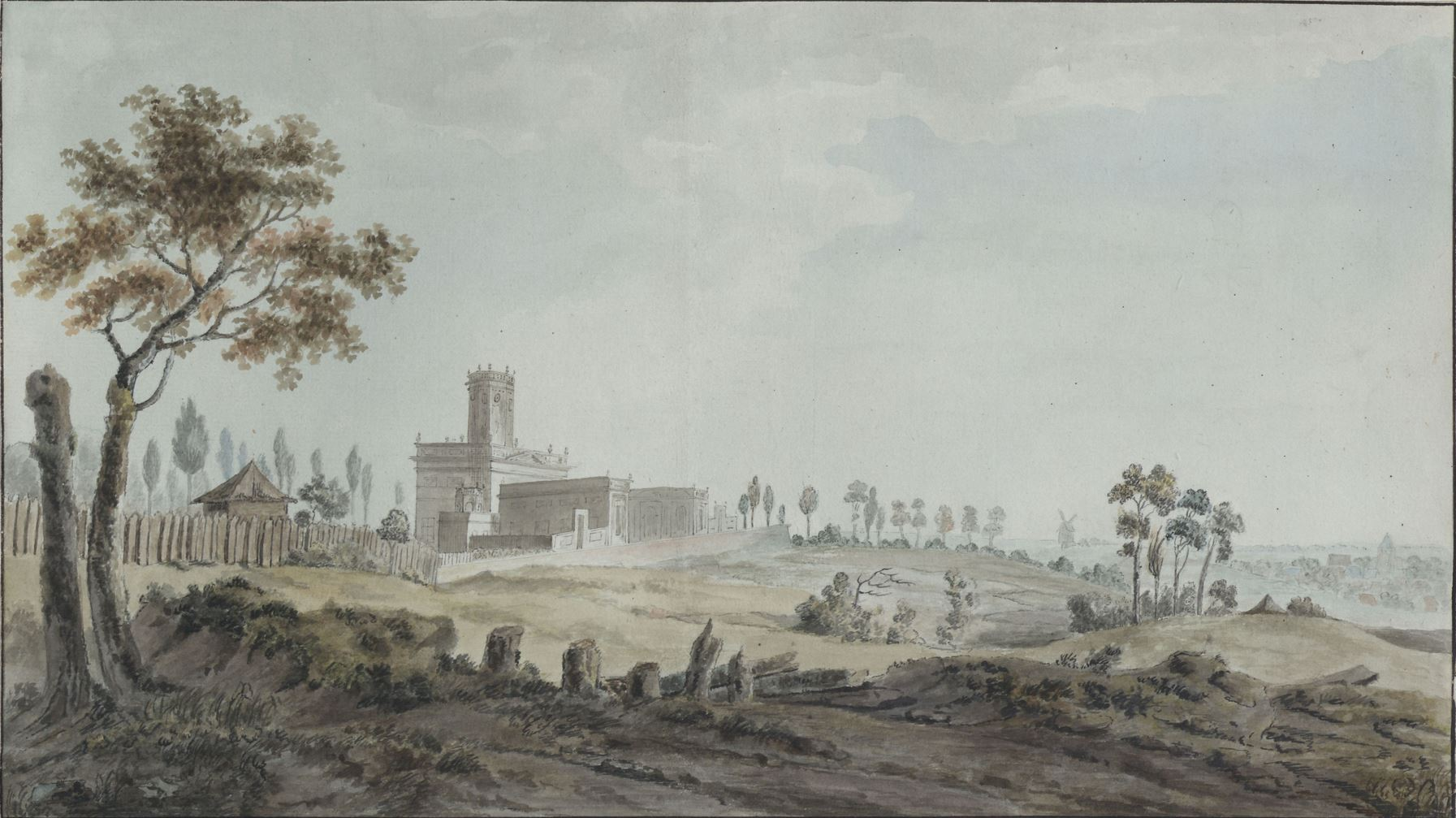
View of the Château Charles around 1779 by Paul Vitzthumb

The Château Charles was a neoclassical palace in Tervuren, Belgium, just outside Brussels. It was intended as summer retreat for Prince Charles Alexander of Lorraine, governor of the Austrian Netherlands. However, it was soon demolished and nothing remains.

== History ==
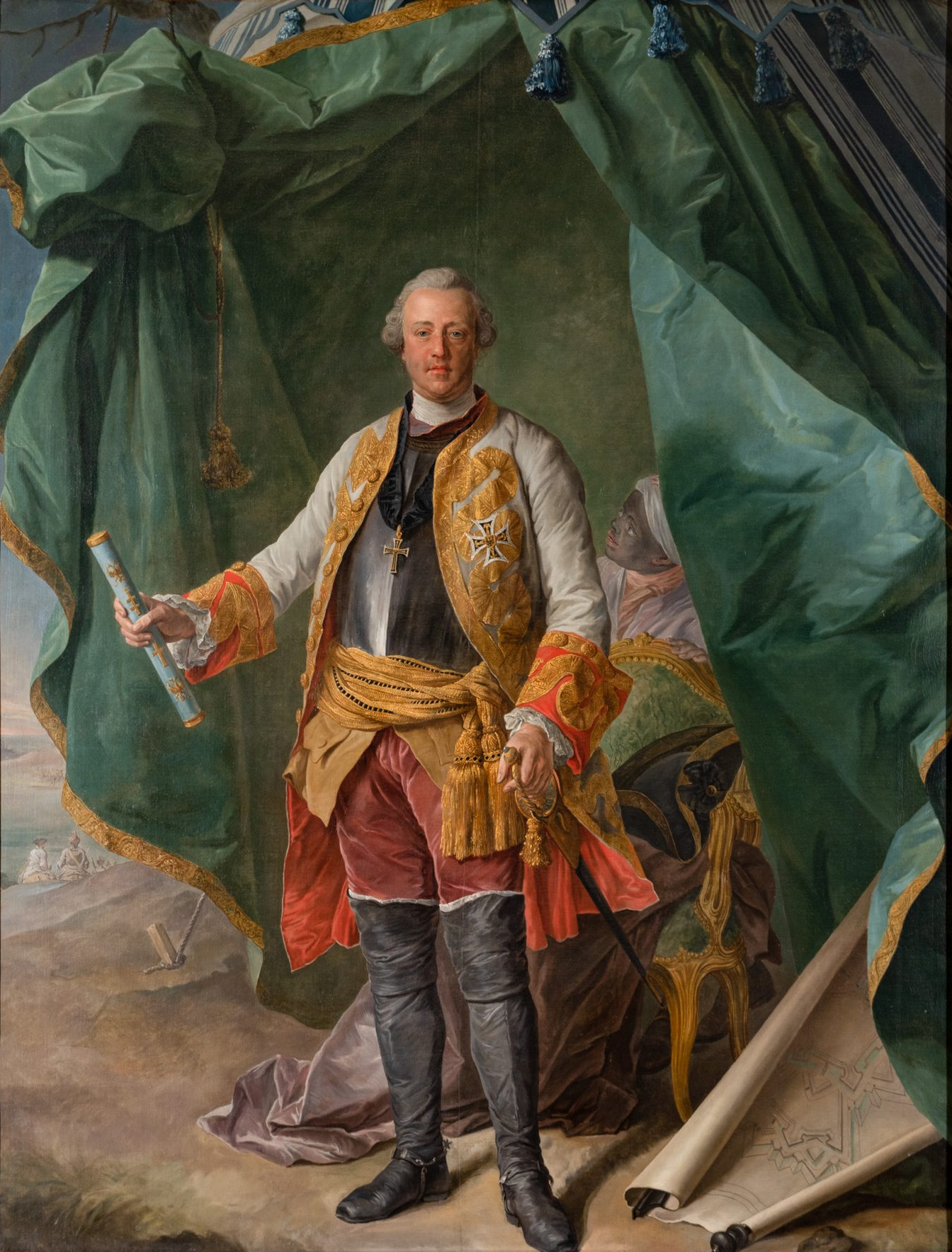
Prince Charles Alexander of Lorraine

Tervuren was one of the main summer retreats of the dukes of Brabant and their successors, the Burgundian dukes and the governors of the Habsburg Netherlands. They primarily used Tervuren Castle as a basis to hunt in the surrounding Sonian Forest. Although the castle was medieval in origin, it was modernized and redesigned over time up to the 18th century. However, as the moated palace became too damp, governor Charles of Lorraine decided to construct a new palace, the Château Charles. He commissioned the architect Laurent-Benoît Dewez to design the new summer lodge. When Dewez fell out of favour, Louis Montoyer and Antoine Payen the Elder completed the palace.

Construction started in 1778. The main building was already completed in 1779, and furnishing followed soon. With large festivities, the palace was put into use on 1 September 1779. It was barely finished when Charles of Lorraine died in 1780. His nephew, Joseph II, Holy Roman Emperor first intended to sell the country house, but ultimately decided to demolish both the Château Charles and Tervuren Castle in order to recycle the building materials to pay off the debts left by Charles of Lorraine. Charles' successors as governors, Archduchess Maria Christina of Austria and her husband Albert Casimir, Duke of Teschen, commissioned a new palace in Laeken, which was constructed between 1782 and 1784.

Nowadays, nothing remains of the Château Charles. The plans made by Dewez can be found back in the National Archives of Belgium. In addition, the National Archives of France have a plan and drawings of what the palace looked like. Olivier Le May made two gouaches of the château, which are now in a private collection.

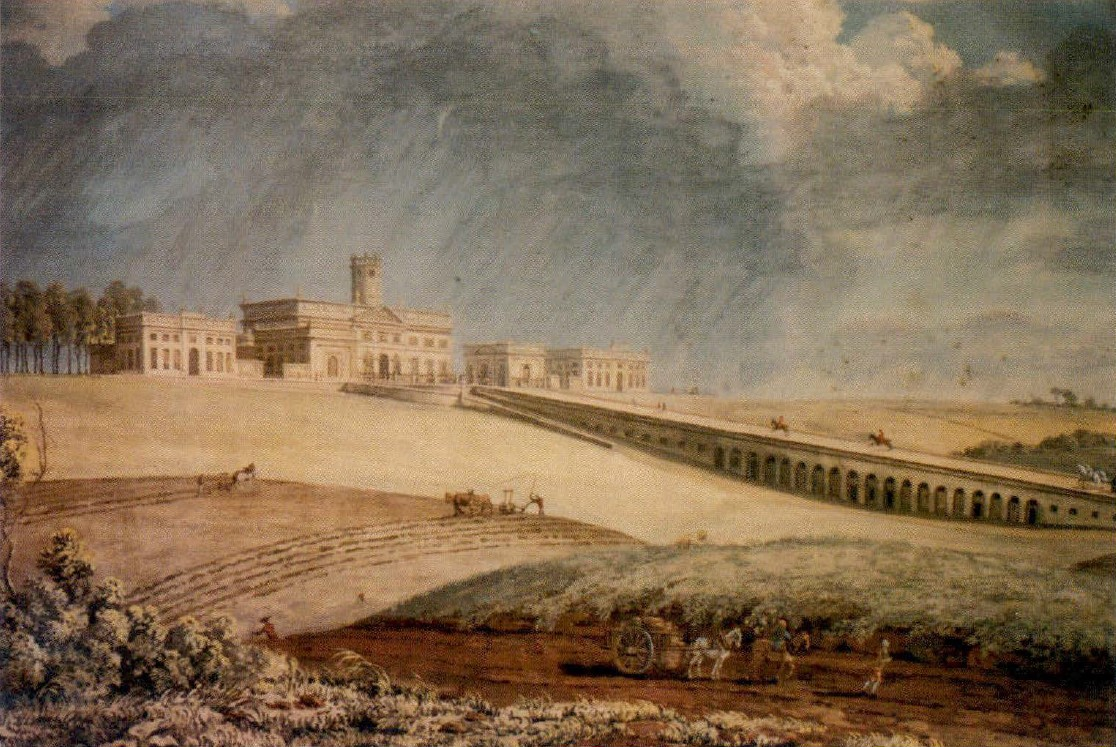
The front of the Château Charles around 1780 by Olivier Le May

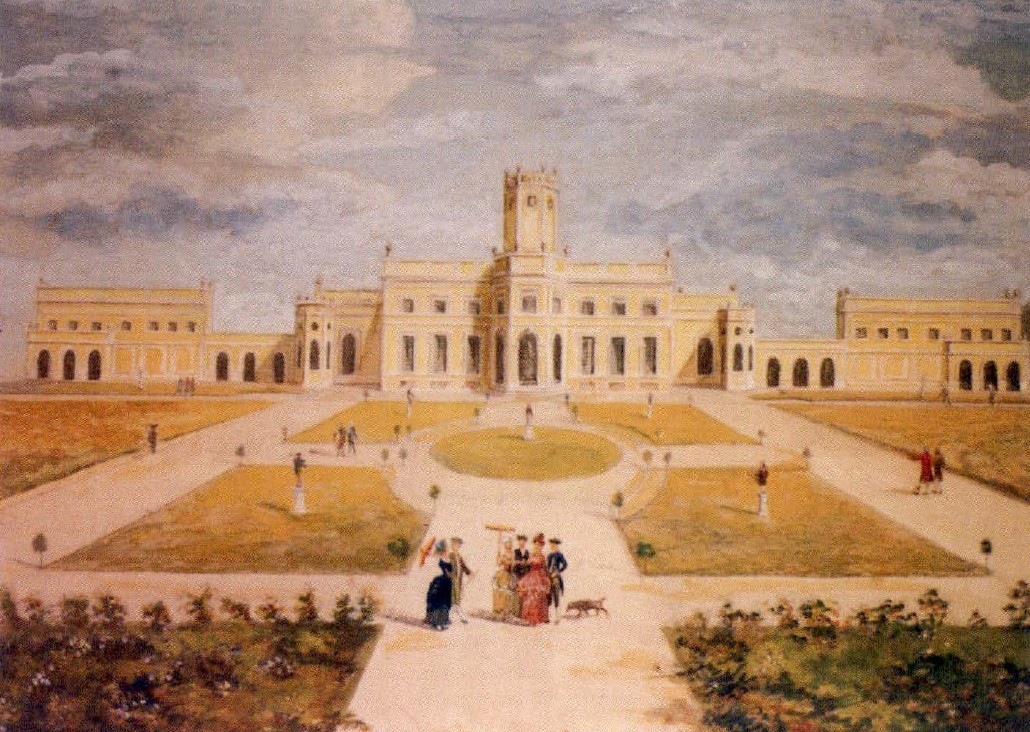
The garden side of the Château Charles around 1780 by Le May

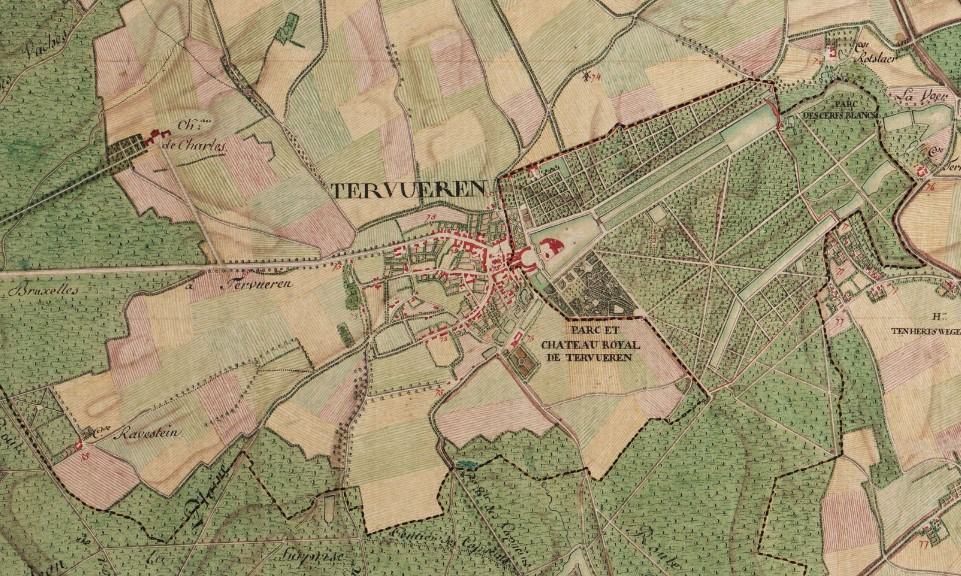
Section of the Ferraris map of 1778 showing the Château Charles on the left and Tervuren Castle and park on the right

== Literature ==
- Hermant, Cécile (1997). "Les aménagements du domaine de Tervueren et le« château Charles » sous Charles de Lorraine, gouverneur général des Pays-Bas autrichiens (1749-1780)". In Mortier, Roland; Hasquin, Hervé (eds.). Études sur le XVIIIe Siècle XXV Parcs, Jardins et Forêts au XVIIIe Siècle. Éditions de l'Université de Bruxelles. pp. 111–144.
- Duquenne, Xavier (2008). "Le nouveau Château de Charles de Lorraine à tervuren" (PDF). Revue belge d'Archéologie en d'Histoire de l'Art/ Belgisch Tijdschrift voor Oudheidkunde en Kunstgeschiedenis (in French). L'Académie royale d'Archéologie de Belgique: 101–132.
- Duquenne, Xavier (2010). "Het Château Charles in de buurt van Tervuren". Historische Woonsteden & Tuinen (in Dutch). Koninklijke Vereniging der Historische Woonsteden en Tuinen van België: 7–14.
- Loir, Christophe (2010). "Un grand château disparu : la création éphémère de Laurent Dewez près de Bruxelles". Bulletin Monumental (in French). 168 (4): 385.
- Derveaux, Elisabeth; Breugelmans, Annemie (2012). Karel van Lorreinen (Lotharingen) & Tervuren : Lunéville 1712 - Tervuren 1780 (in Dutch). Tervuren: Koninklijke Heemkundige Kring St-Hubertus (Tervuren). p. 95.

== See also ==
Other residences used by Charles of Lorraine:

- Palace of Charles of Lorraine in Brussels
- Château of Mariemont
- Tervuren Castle
