= Antoine Payen =

Antoine Payen may refer to:

- Antoine Payen the Younger (1792–1853), Belgian painter and naturalist
- Antoine Payen the Elder (1748–1798), Belgian architect
- Antoine Payen (animator) (1902–1985), French animator
