= Pavilion of Tervuren =

Former palace in Tervuren, Belgium

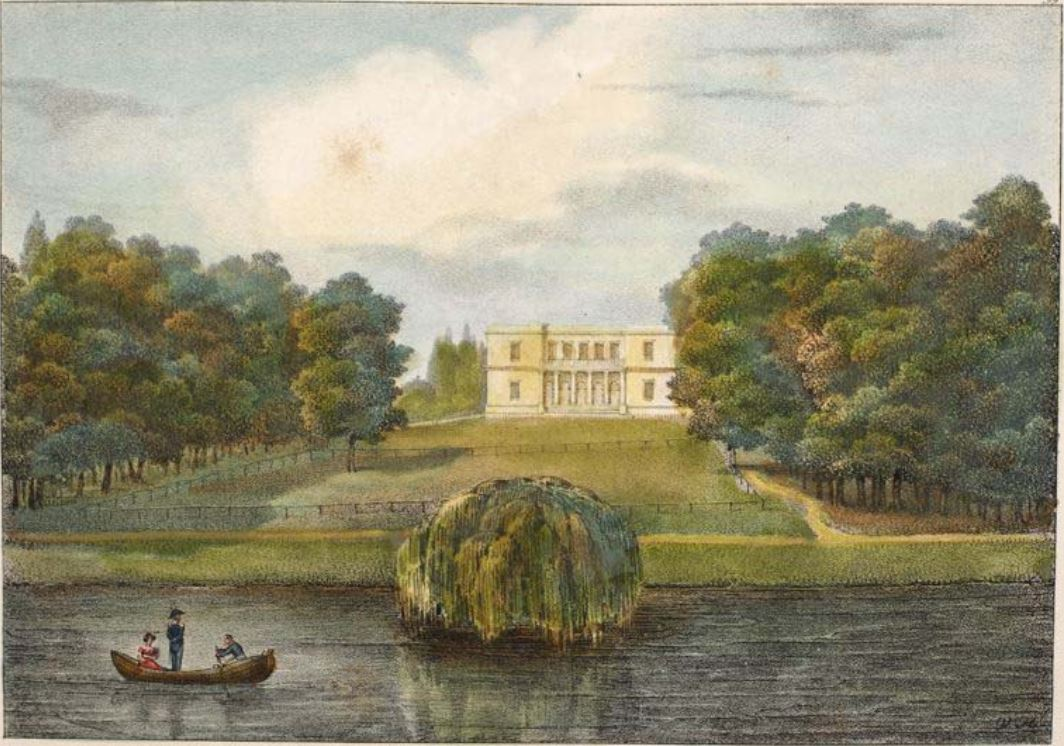
The Pavilion of Tervuren seen from the canal in the Warande

The Pavilion of Tervuren (Dutch: Paviljoen van Tervuren; French: Pavillon de Tervueren) was a summer palace for the prince of Orange, the future King William II of the Netherlands, constructed between 1817 and 1823. It was located in Tervuren, Belgium, just outside Brussels. After the Belgian Revolution in 1830, it was transferred to the Belgian royal family. The former empress of Mexico, Charlotte of Belgium, lived in the palace from 1867 until it burned down in 1879. Nowadays, the Palace of Colonies stands in its place, and is part of the Royal Museum for Central Africa (RMCA).

== History ==
=== William II ===
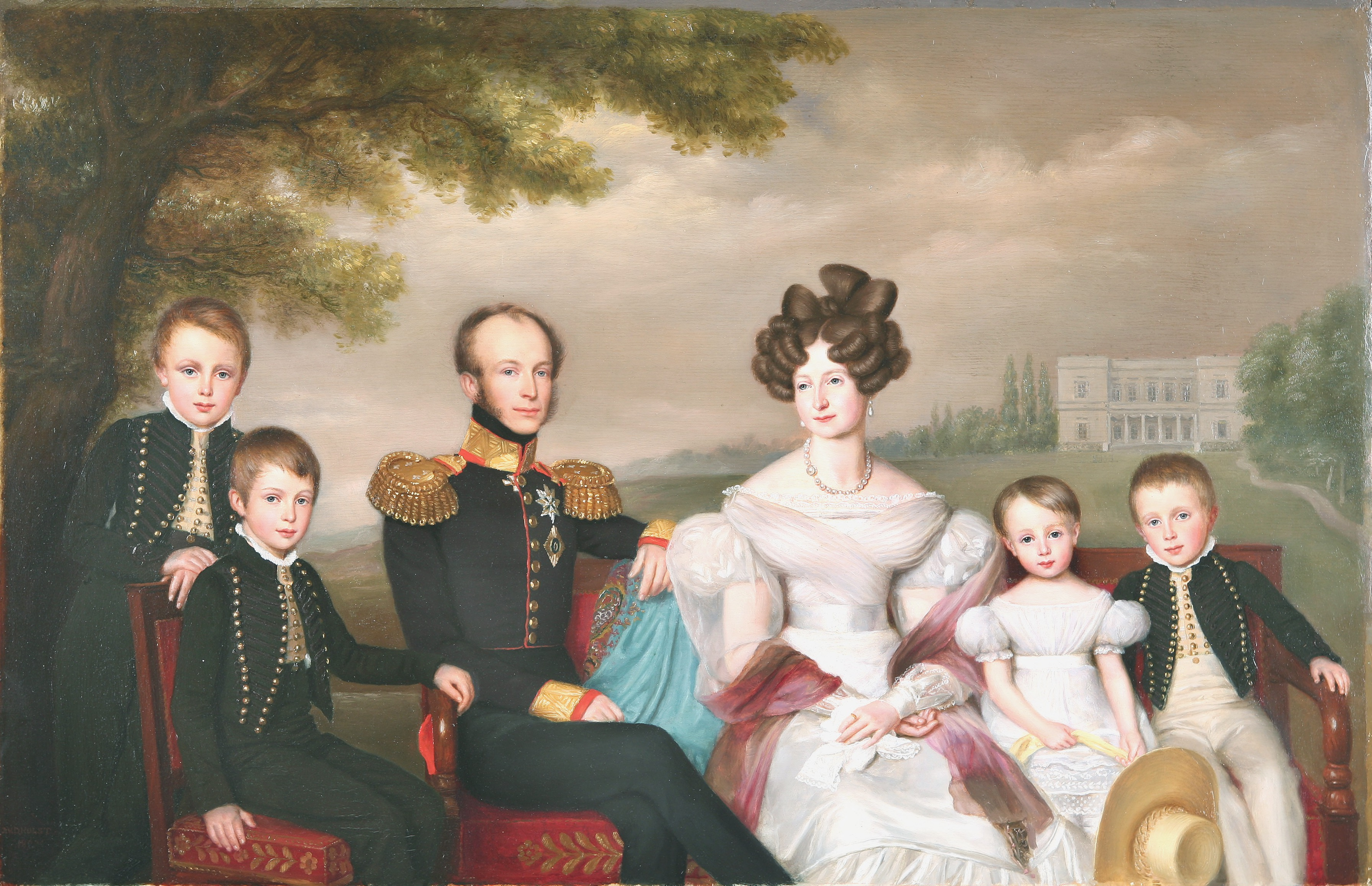
King William II of the Netherlands and his family, with the Pavilion of Tervuren behind

In the autumn of 1815, William, Prince of Orange, was given control over Tervuren, Belgium. As Tervuren Castle was demolished in 1782, a new summer palace was built for his participation at the Battle of Waterloo. It was located in the northwestern edge of Tervuren Park, also known as the Warande. The park was expanded to ensure sufficient privacy for the royal family. Construction started in 1817 and took five years to complete.

The pavilion was lavishly furnished and decorated, including reliefs by the French sculptor François Rude, who was then living in exile in Brussels. The building was surrounded by terraces and gardens. To the east extended an Italianate garden decorated with neoclassical statues, including Claudius Civilis by the sculptor Jean-Louis Van Geel.

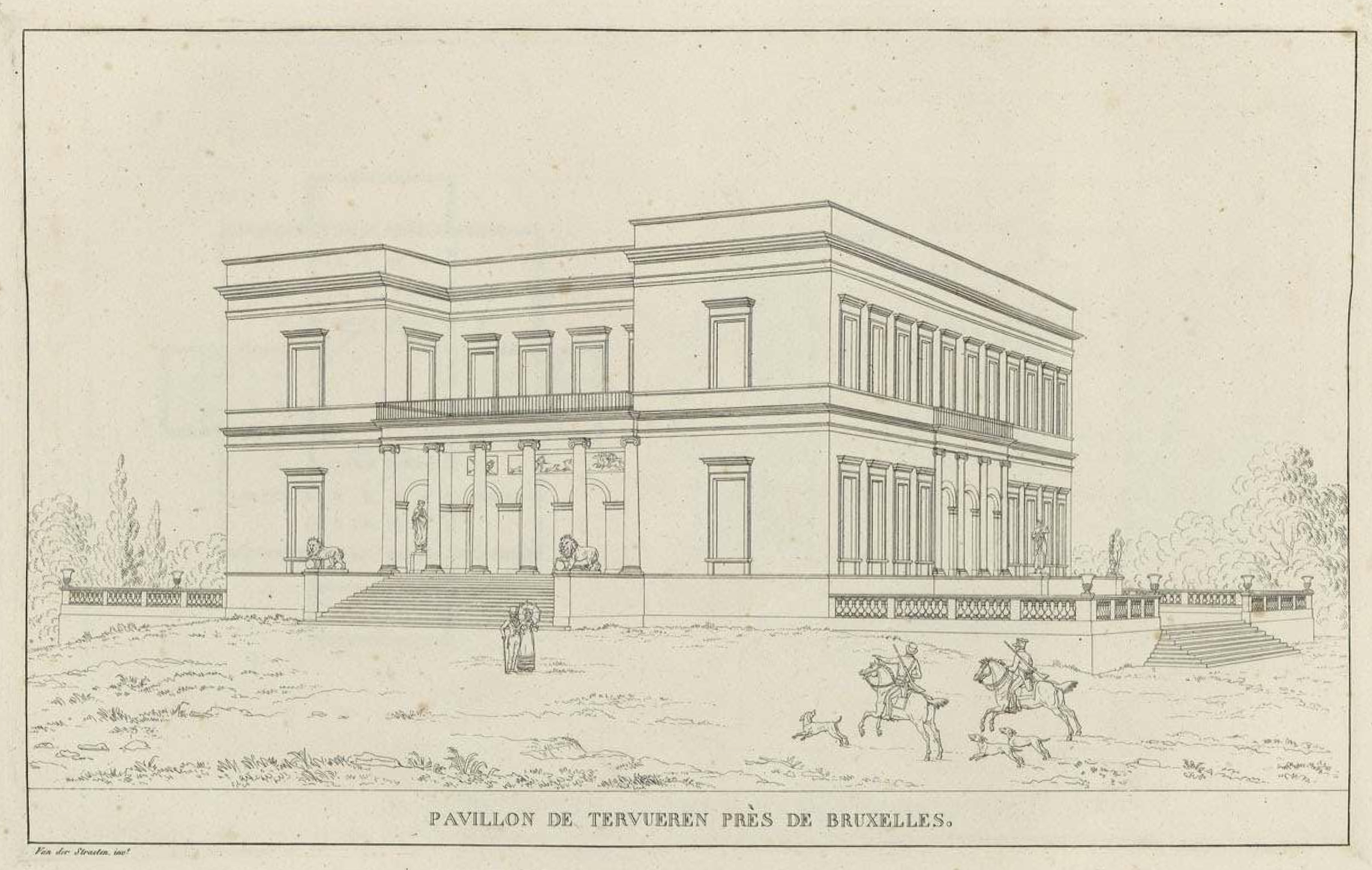
Engraving of the Pavilion of Tervuren, from Pierre-Jacques Goetghebuer's Choix des monuments (1827)

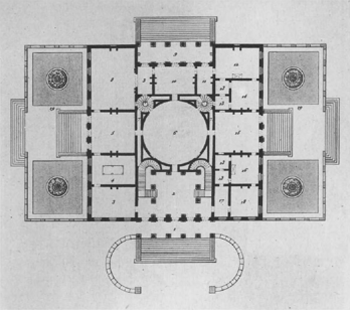
Floor plan of the pavilion (Goetghebuer, 1827)

=== Leopold II ===
After the Belgian Revolution in 1830, the pavilion, together with the entire Tervuren Park, became the property of the Belgian State. However, most of the furniture was returned to the Dutch royal family. The pavilion and the surrounding park were given to King Leopold I, who then gave it to his heir, King Leopold II. Under Leopold II, who had a special fondness for Tervuren and at one point even considered living there permanently, the Warande was further expanded through targeted purchases.

=== Charlotte of Belgium ===
After her return to Belgium in the summer of 1867, Charlotte of Belgium, former Empress consort of Mexico and sister of Leopold II, moved into the pavilion for a few months. However, the building seemed to be insufficiently furnished and ill-adapted to the cold season. On 8 October 1867, Charlotte moved in with her brother and sister-in-law in the Palace of Laeken. She did not return to the pavilion until May 1869. On the night of 2 March 1879, a fire broke out in the pavilion. Empress Charlotte was woken up by her ladies-in-waiting and escaped the burning building, which was destroyed in the fire. She then moved to Bouchout Castle, where she stayed until her death in 1927.

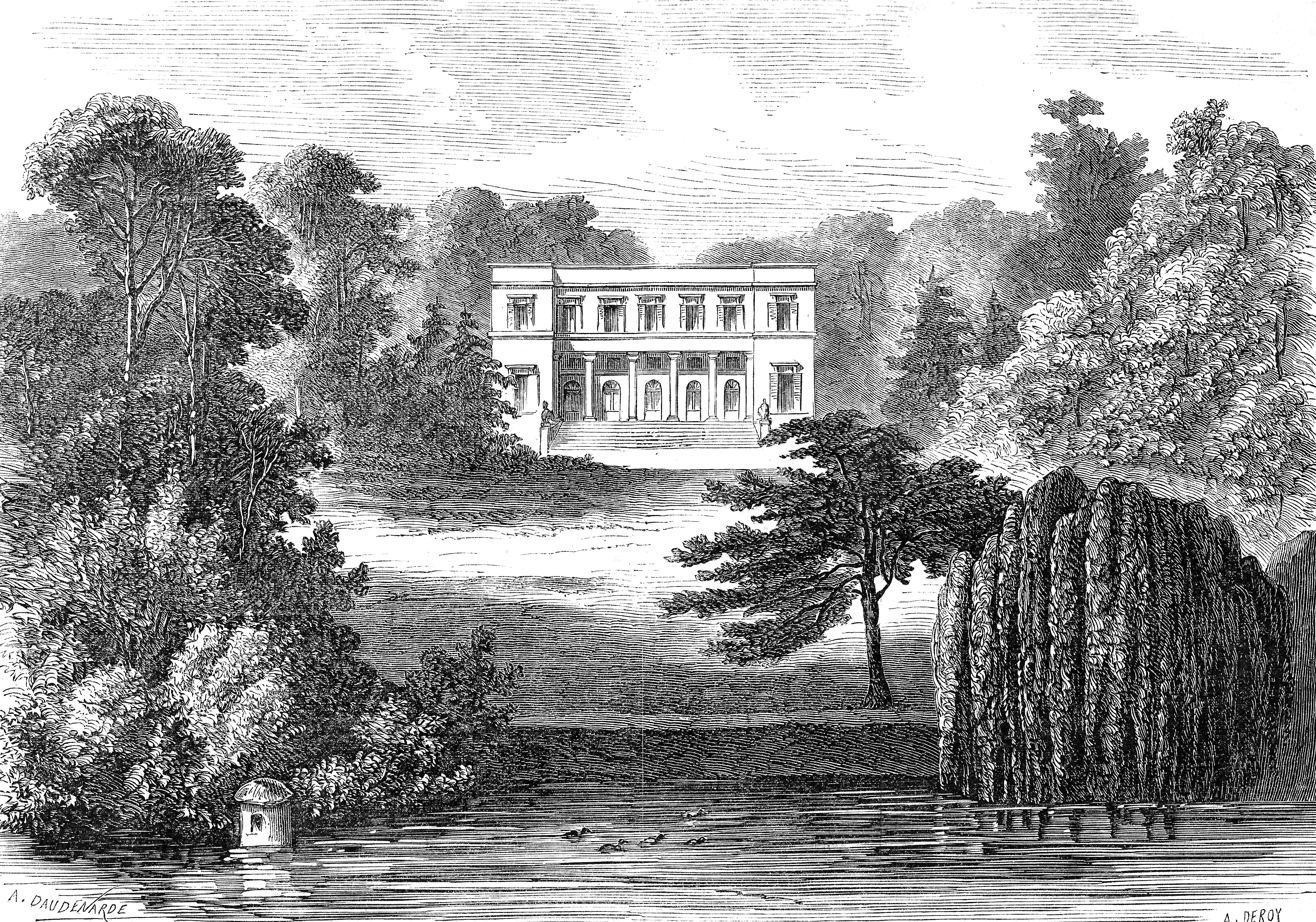
The Pavilion of Tervuren in 1867, etching from Le Monde illustré

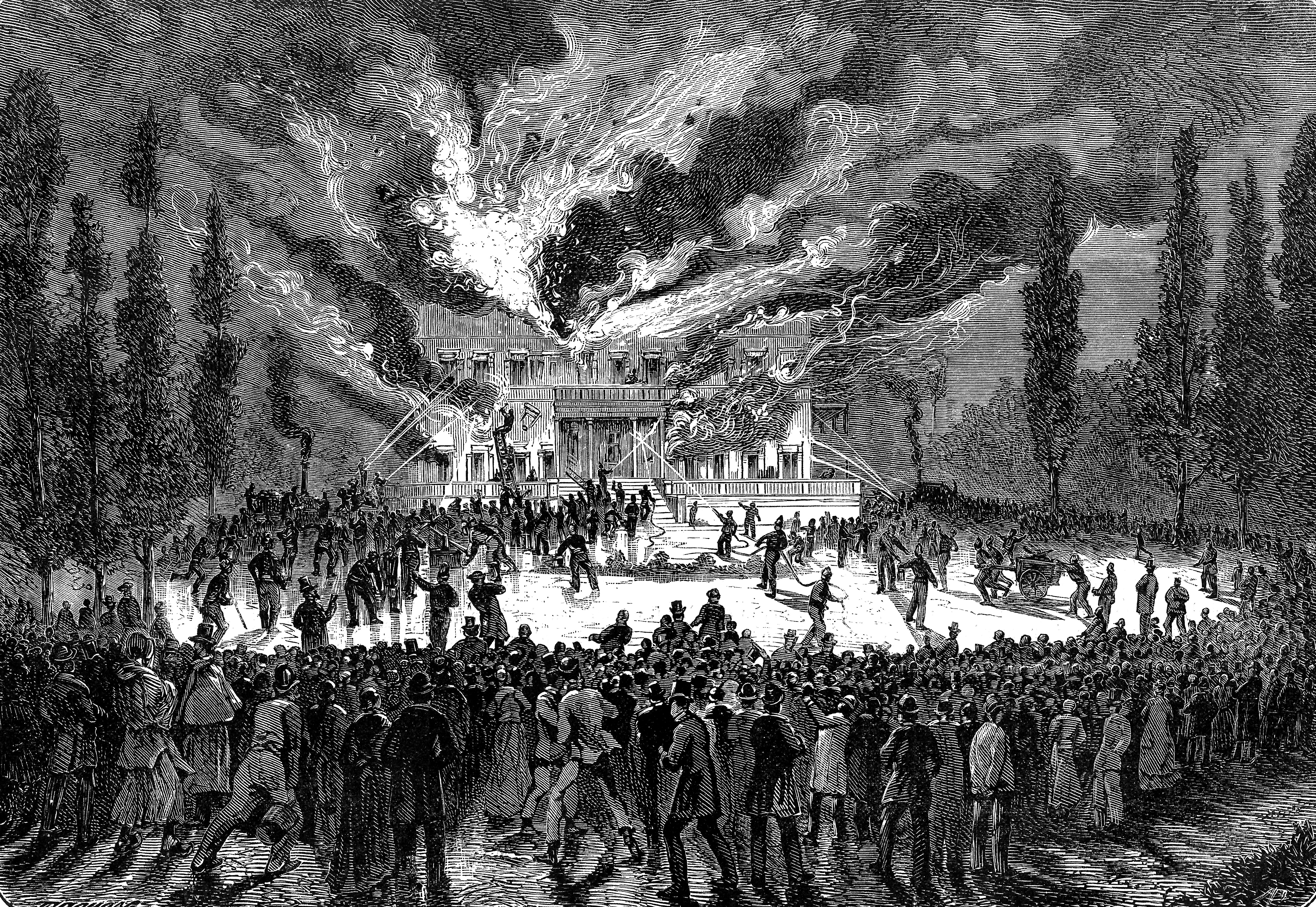
The Pavilion of Tervuren on fire, 2 March 1879

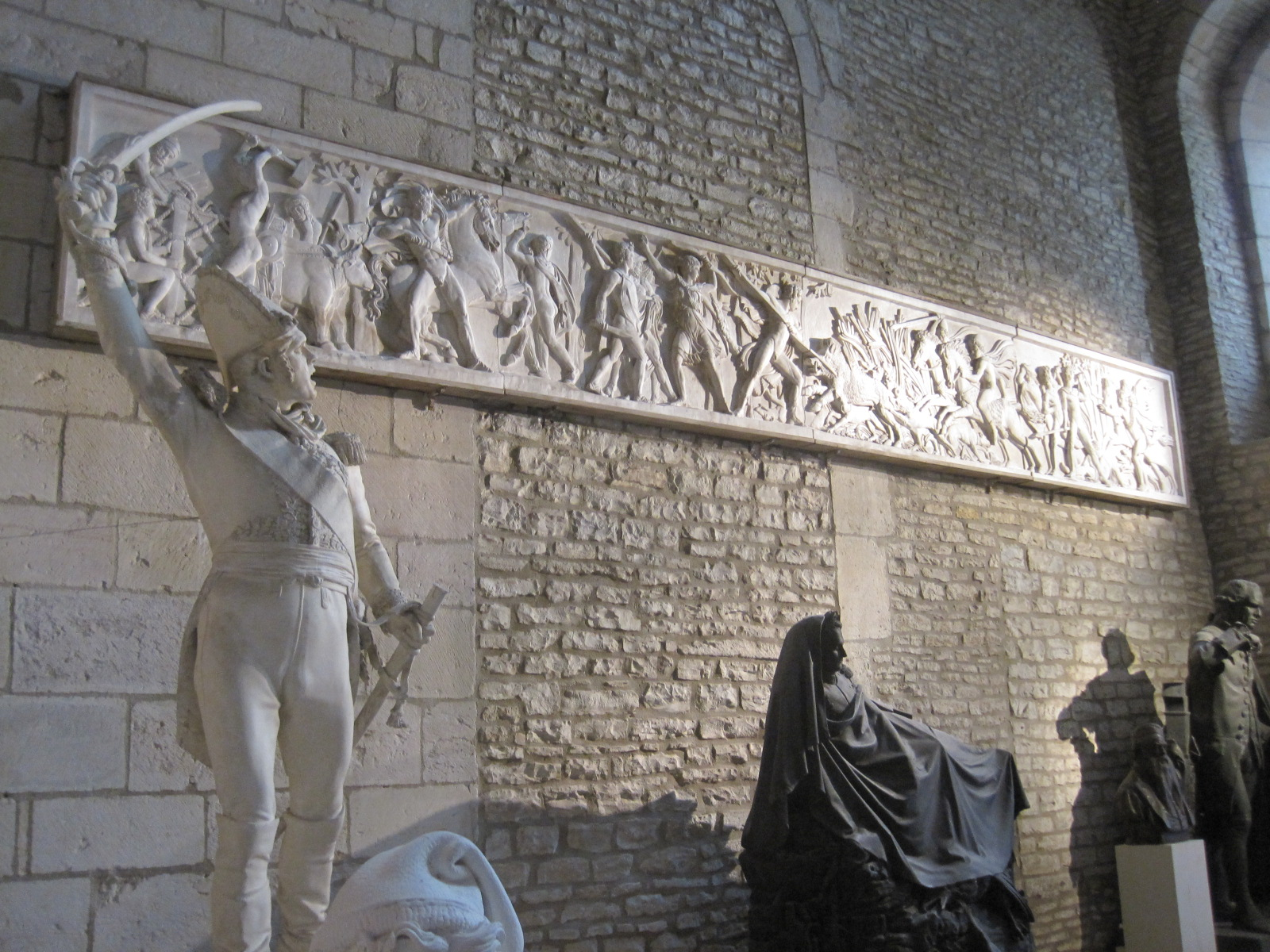
Cast of the relief The Hunt of Meleager by François Rude. The original was lost in the fire of 1879.

=== Aftermath ===
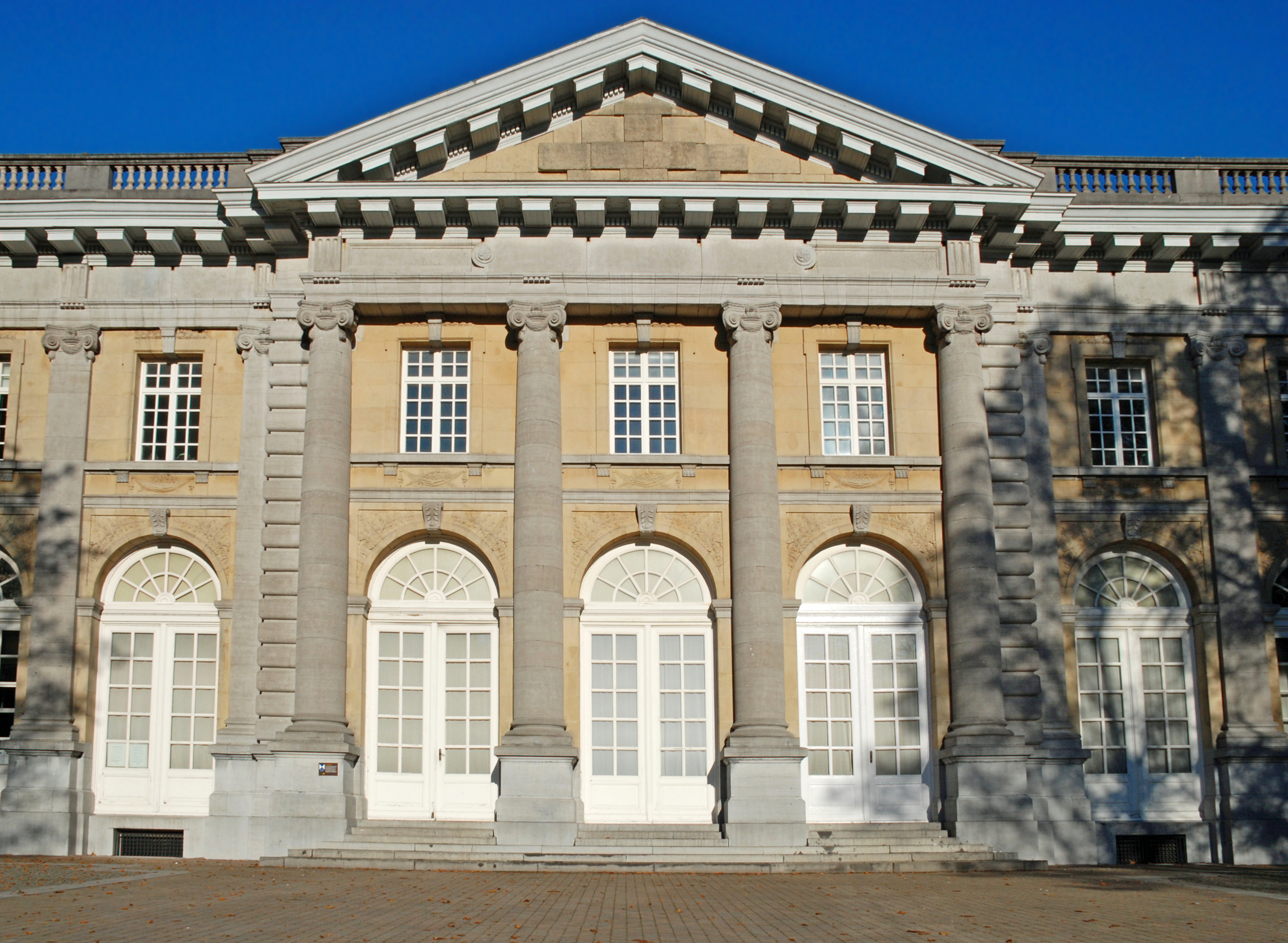
The Palace of Colonies stands on the location of the pavilion.

The pavilion was not rebuilt and Tervuren Park remained empty until 1897. At the request of Leopold II, the 1897 Brussels International Exposition took place simultaneously in Brussels and Tervuren. There, the Congo Free State's prosperity was brought to the public's attention. To make the colonial exhibition attractive and accessible, Tervuren was connected to the capital with a wide, 11 km (6.8 mi) tree-lined avenue, flanked by a tram line, which was constructed for the occasion. At the end of this avenue, on the site of the burnt-down pavilion, the Palace of Colonies was built, designed by the architect Ernest Acker. The pavilion was intended as an exhibition space and was framed by classical French gardens with ponds, staircases and statues designed by the French landscape architect Elie Lainé. Lainé became well known in the 1870s as the designer of the garden at Waddesdon Manor in Buckinghamshire, England, commissioned by Ferdinand de Rothschild. He was exponent to the growing interest in Le Nôtre-styled gardens, which would see a revival mainly due to Henri and Achille Duchêne.

=== Royal Museum for Central Africa ===
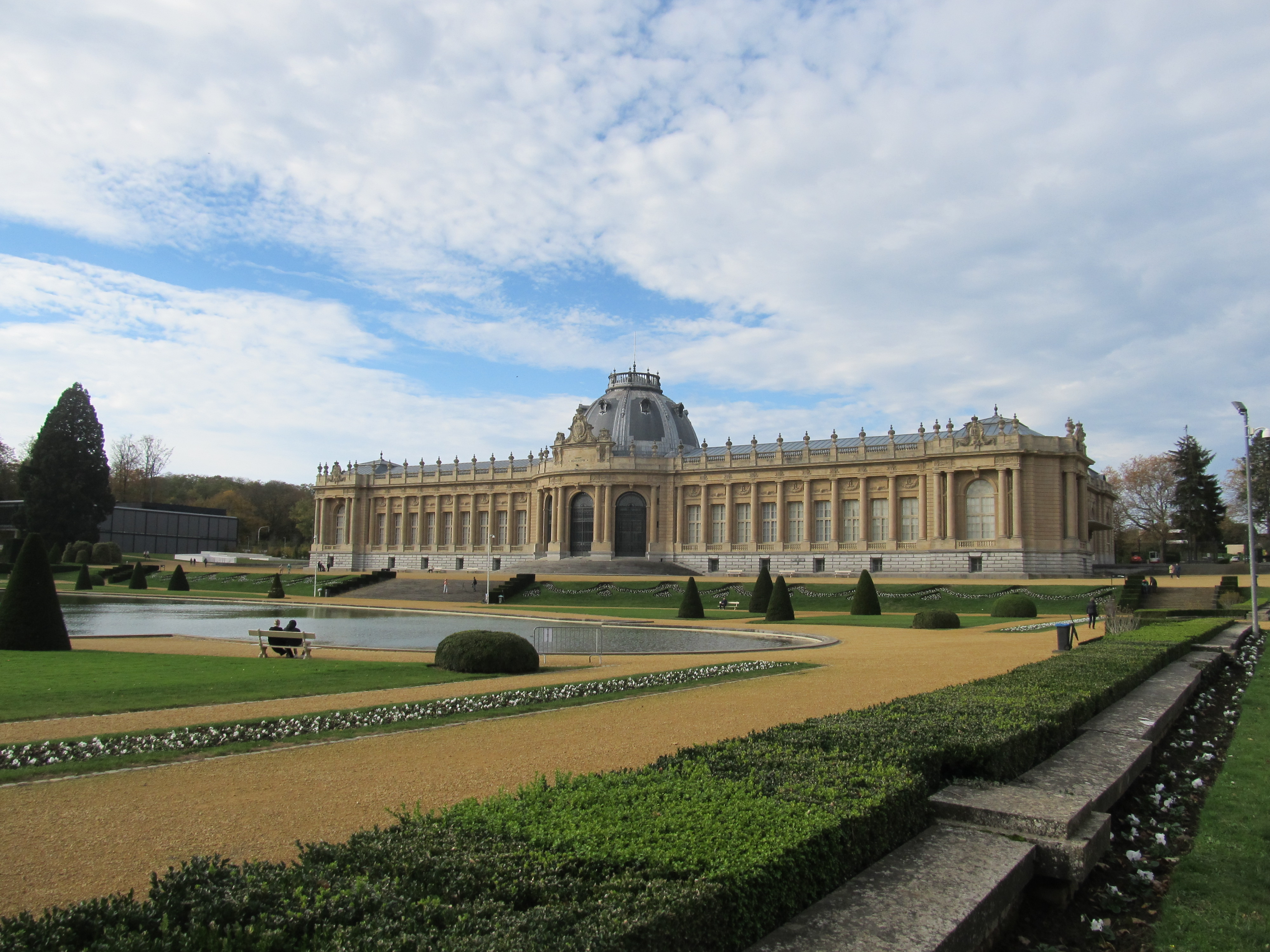
Royal Museum for Central Africa

Due to its success, the Palace of Colonies has been a museum since 1898. However, the available space soon proved insufficient, so Leopold II decided on 3 December 1902 to expand it so Chinese and Japanese exhibitions could be shown. The project was completed thanks to subsidies from the Congo Free State. The French architect Charles Girault, whose Petit Palais was liked by Leopold II at the Paris Exposition of 1900, was commissioned to develop a concept that encompassed the entire Lokkaartsveld along the Leuvensesteenweg, including of the Palace of Colonies site. In addition to a museum, the project would have also built an international conference center and a school. Following the death of Leopold II, however, only the Congo Museum, the current Royal Museum for Central Africa, would be realized.
