= Olivier Le May =

French painter (1734–1797)

Olivier Le May (26 May 1734 – 1797) was a French painter and engraver.

== Life ==
He was born in the parish of Saint-Nicolas in Valenciennes and trained at the Académie de Valenciennes. Around 1754, he left his home town for Paris. He was a friend of Louis Joseph Watteau (1731–1798), who introduced him to the sculptor Jacques Saly (1717–1776), also from Valenciennes and devoted to helping people from the town. Saly in turn recommended him to Philippe-Jacques de Loutherbourg (1740–1812), with whom Le May became friends early in 1755. He was also inspired by Dutch masters such as Nicolaes Berchem (1628–1683) and Karel Dujardin (1622–1678), whose works he studied during his free time in the galleries of Paris.

According to Édouard Fromentin he travelled to Italy around 1770. He contributed illustrations to Voyage pittoresque de la France by Jean-Benjamin de Laborde, with his works engraved in 1784 by François Denis Née (1732–1817). He travelled much on the coast of the Spanish Netherlands and the Dutch Republic and went to America twice. He also set off from Bordeaux for Saint-Domingue in July 1787—where he filled a 70-page album with pencil, and pen-and-ink drawings. He also travelled to Ostend, the Rhine Valley, and northern Italy (especially the towns around Bergamo, Verona and Vicenza).

He offered two paintings to his home town to mark his reception into the Académie royale de peinture et de sculpture in 1785. He spent several periods in Brussels before returning to France at the end of his life, dying in Paris.

== Sources ==
- https://web.archive.org/web/20150402102425/http://www.valenciennes.fr/fileadmin/PORTAIL/VA/culture/musee/pdf/page-accueil/livret_OLIVIER_LEMAY_web.pdf
