= Antoine Payen the Elder =

Belgian architect and army engineers officer

Antoine Payen the Elder (1748–1798) was an architect and army engineers officer who designed several châteaux and villas in what were then the Austrian Netherlands. His best known work is the Belvédère Castle. But he was also involved in the completion of Château Charles, when Laurent-Benoît Dewez was dismissed. He initially collaborated with Charles de Wailly. His son Antoine Payen the Younger was a painter and naturalist.
