= Antoine Payen the Younger =

Belgian painter and naturalist

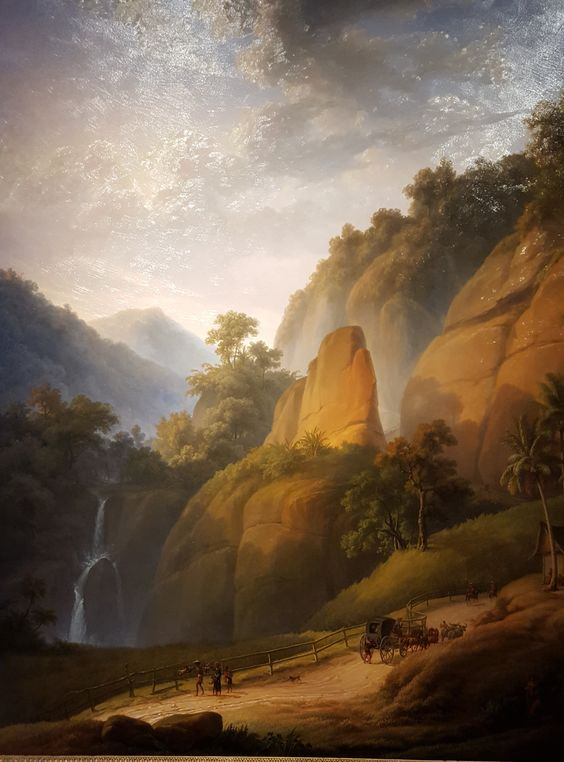
De Grote Postweg bij Rejapolah (The Great Postal Route near Rejapolah), 1828, oil on canvas, 167 cm x 140 cm, Rijksmuseum, Amsterdam

Auguste Antoine Joseph Payen (12 November 1792 – 18 January 1853), also known as Antoine Payen the Younger, was a Belgian painter and naturalist. He was born in Brussels and died in Tournai. His father, Antoine Payen the Elder, was an architect.

Payen was commissioned by Dutch King William I to create a series of paintings of the landscape of the Dutch East Indies. One of these works, The Great Postal Route near Rejapolah, painted in 1828, hangs in the Rijksmuseum in Amsterdam.

While in the Dutch East Indies in 1819, Payen met an eight-year-old Raden Saleh and, recognizing his talent for drawing, became Saleh's first mentor. Saleh would follow Payen to Europe three years after Payen's departure from Java in 1826.
