= Ferraris map =

18th-century map

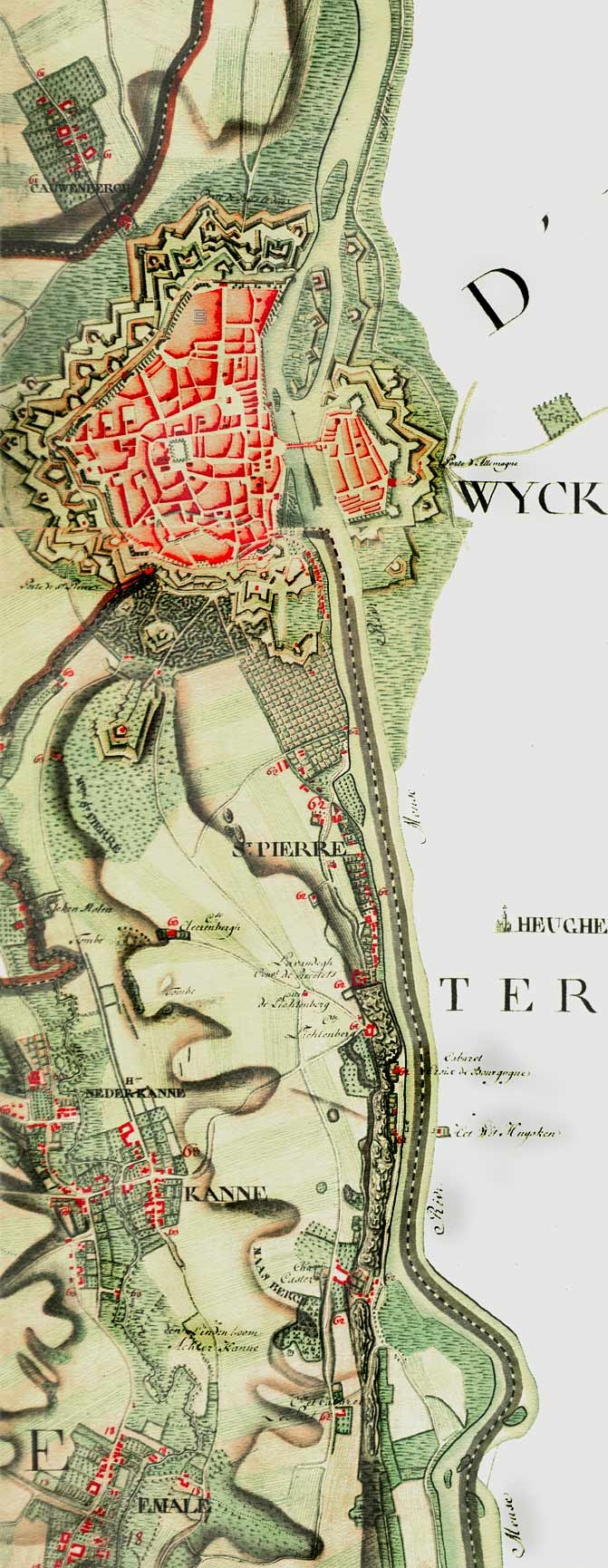
Map of Maastricht, Netherlands

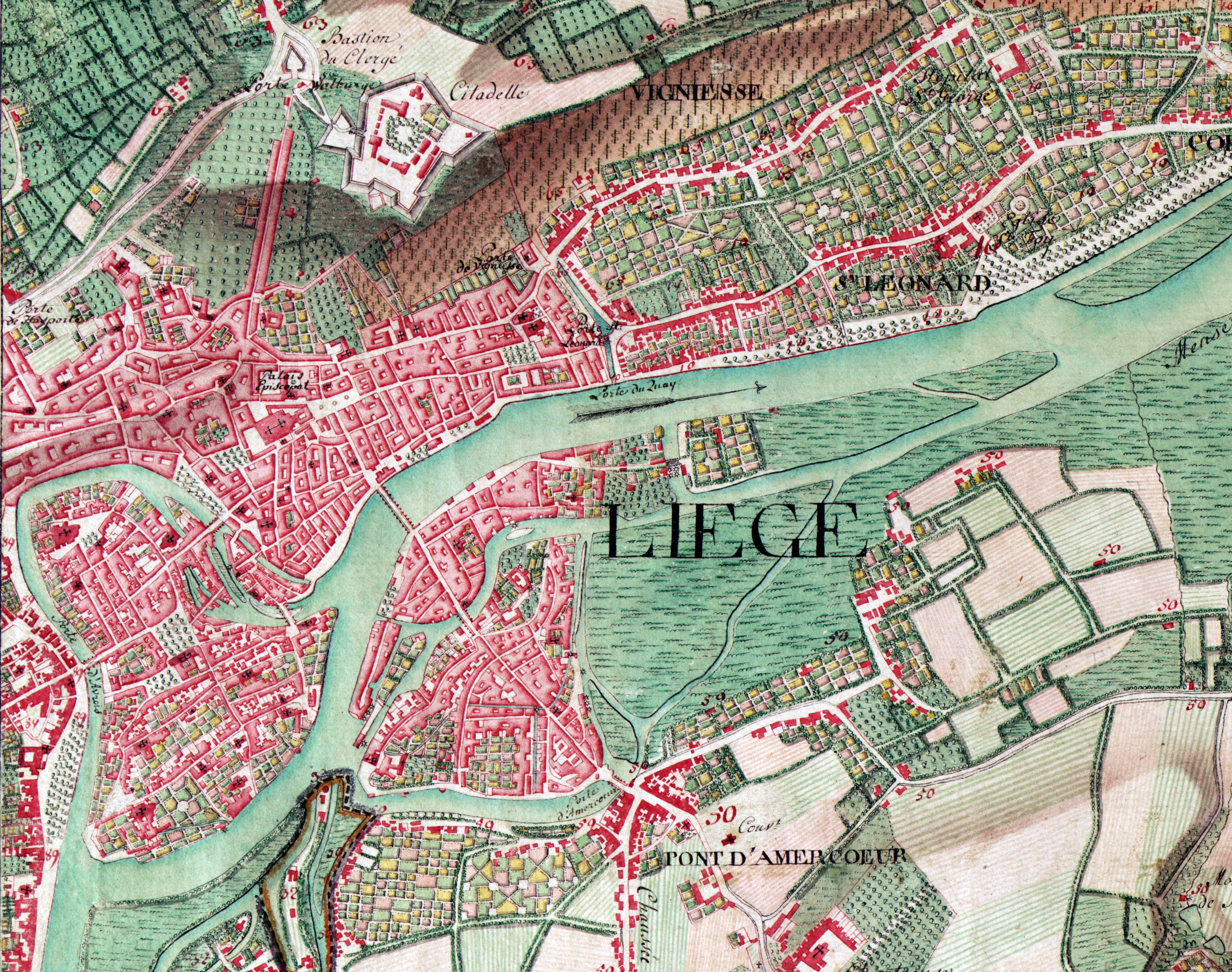
Map of Liège, Belgium

The Ferraris map or map of the Austrian Netherlands is a historical map created between 1770 and 1778 by Count Joseph de Ferraris and includes 275 sheets published at the original scale of 1/11.5. The map was made in response to a request by Prince Charles Alexander of Lorraine. It is the first systematic, large scale mapping of modern-day Belgium and parts of Western Europe.

== History ==
The topographic survey was performed on a territory corresponding to today's Belgium and Luxembourg as well as some territories now belonging to Germany and the Netherlands. There are three original versions of the map. The Royal Library of Belgium, the Austrian National Library and National Library of the Netherlands each have one.

== Importance ==
The Ferraris maps reflect the detailed state of the Southern Netherlands towards the end of the Ancien Régime, just before the start of the Industrial Revolution that drastically transformed landscapes. Looking at the maps today, it is obvious how much the areas have changed over time as people began to have a bigger impact on the environment.

Nowadays, Ferraris maps have multiple uses. Environmental organizations often use them to describe the "original" (i.e. pre-industrial) state of an area. The maps can also help identify archaeological finds and engineers can consult the maps to check for soil stability, since the maps feature mining pits that no longer exist but can still pose a danger.
