= Dispargum =

Dispargum could refer to either the city of Duisburg on the Rhine, or the village of Duisburg near Brussels, or the city of Diest.

== Disputed location ==
Gregory of Tours (II,9) reported that the Frankish king "Chlogio" (as he spells his name in Latin; he is more commonly known as Chlodio) attacked from a fort (castrum) named "Dispargum" on the edge of the "Thoringian" land, which is described as being west of the Rhine. One translation of what Gregory wrote, adding some Latin key words in square brackets, is as follows:

It is commonly said that the Franks came originally from Pannonia and first colonized the banks of the Rhine. Then they crossed the river, marched through Thuringia [Thoringiam transmeasse], and set up in each country district [pagus] and each city [civitas] long-haired kings chosen from the foremost and most noble family of their race. [...] They also say that Clodio, a man of high birth and marked ability among his people, was King of the Franks and that he lived in the castle of Duisberg [Dispargum castrum] in Thuringian territory [in terminum Thoringorum]. In those parts, that is towards the south, the Romans occupied the territory as far as the River Loire. [...] Clodio sent spies to the town of Cambrai. When they discovered all that they needed to know, he himself followed and crushed the Romans and captured the town. He lived there only a short time and then occupied the country up to the Somme. Some say that Merovech, the father of Childeric, was descended from Clodio.

This description of locations does not match the normal medieval and modern "Thuringia", which is far inland and east of the Rhine and distant from all known Frankish areas.

Dispargum has therefore been interpreted many ways, for example possibly as Duisburg on the Rhine itself, or Duisburg near Brussels, or Diest, which is also in Belgium. The latter two proposals would fit the geography well, because they are within striking distance of the Silva Carbonaria, west of the Rhine, and close to Toxandria, which is known to have been settled by the Salians in the time of Julian the Apostate. It suggests that "Thoringorum" (genitive case) was actually referring to the "Civitas Tungrorum". This matches Gregory's previous mention in the same passage of how the Franks had earlier settled on the banks of the Rhine and then moved into "Thoringia" on the left side of the Rhine.
