= Quinotaur =

Mythical creature

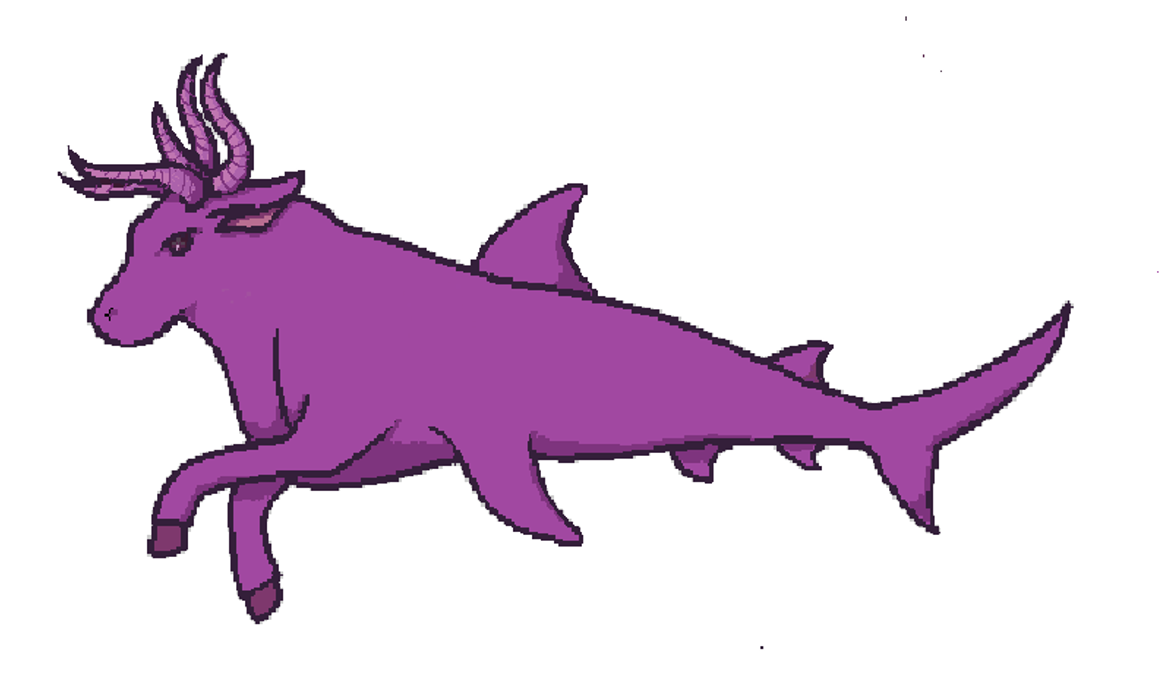
An imagining of the Quinotaur

The Quinotaur (Latin: Quinotaurus) is a mythical sea creature mentioned in the 7th century Frankish Chronicle of Fredegar. Referred to as "the beast of Neptune which resembles a Quinotaur", it was held to have fathered Meroveus by attacking the wife of the Frankish king Chlodio and thus to have sired the line of Merovingian kings.

The "bull with five horns" was likened by Pseudo-Fredegar (interpolating Gregory of Tours, who authored an earlier record of the legend) to both Neptune and the Minotaur, as it was both seaborne and taurine. It is not known whether one or both traits are original to the legend or if their combination is an accretion by one or both of the Christian authors. The clerical Latinity of the name does not indicate whether it is a translation of some genuine Frankish creature or a coining.

The suggested rape and subsequent family relation of this monster attributed to Frankish mythology correspond to both the Indo-European etymology of Neptune (according to Jaan Puhvel, from Proto-Indo-European *népōts, "grandson" or "nephew", compare also the Indo-Aryan Apam Napat, "grandson/nephew of the water") and to bull-related fertility myths in Greek mythology, where for example the princess Europa was abducted by the god Zeus, in the form of a white bull, that swam her to Crete; or to the very myth of the Minotaur, which was the product of Pasiphaë's, a Cretan Queen's, intercourse with a white bull, initially allotted to King Minos, Pasiphaë's husband, as a sacrifice for Poseidon.
