= Edouard Manduau =

Belgian painter

Edouard Jean Marie Manduau
- Born: Edouard Jean Marie Manduau ca. 1855; Ixelles, Belgium
- Died: ca. 1938; Nieuwpoort, Belgium
- Occupation: Painter

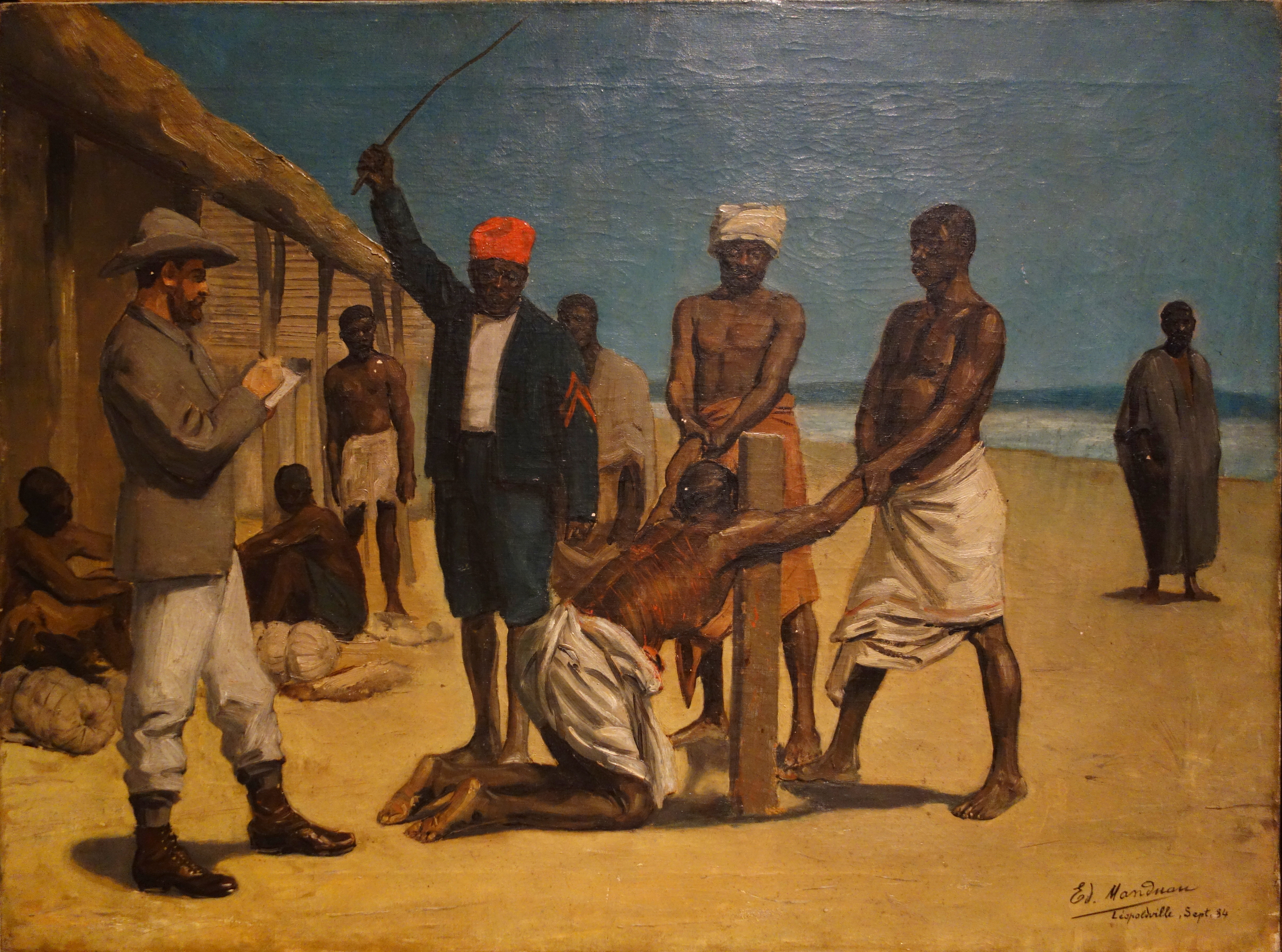
Manduau's Civilization in Congo (1884) was critical of the Congo Free State

Edouard Jean Marie Manduau (1855–1938) was a Belgian landscape painter and watercolorist best known for his work in the Congo Free State and the countryside around Brussels.

Manduau was born in Ixelles, and studied in art academies in London and Brussels (1871), where he was a classmate and friend of James Ensor. In 1884 he joined the International Association of the Congo, where he led expeditions and public works projects. His drawings and paintings, about 70 in number, created a valuable record of the Congo and its people; when in 1885 they were exhibited at Brussels, he was widely acclaimed. However, in protest at some of the "civilizing methods" practiced in the Congo, he resigned and returned to Belgium, where he worked for the opposition newspaper Le Moniteur du Congo. He exhibited at the Salon des Artistes congolais in 1933. Manuau died in Nieuwpoort, Belgium, in 1938. His works are displayed at the Royal Museum for Central Africa in Tervuren.
