= Frankish religion =

Frankish religion may refer to:

- Frankish paganism
- Frankish Christianity
