= Lernout =

Lernout may refer to:

- Lernout & Hauspie, Belgian speech recognition technology company
- Brett Lernout (born 1995), Canadian professional ice hockey player
- Greg Lernout (born 1980), Canadian radio broadcaster
- Ward Lernout (born 1931), Belgian painter
