= Jacques-Antoine Dassier =

Genevan medallist (1715–1759)

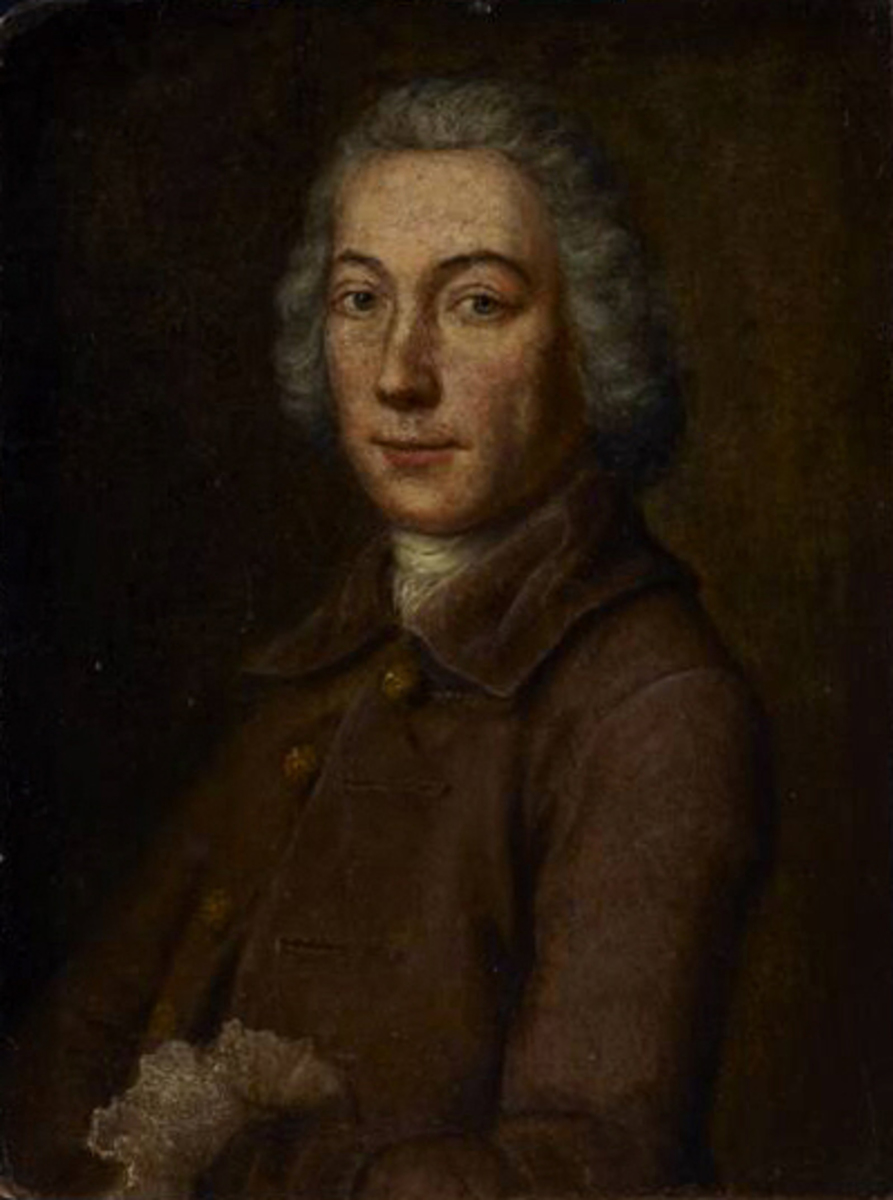
Portrait by Robert Gardelle

Jacques-Antoine Dassier (1715–1759) was a Genevan medallist. He was active in London, as James Anthony Dassier, from 1740 to the mid-1750s.

== Life ==
He was born in Geneva on 15 November 1715, the son of Jean Dassier. He received lessons in drawing and engraving from his father.

At 17, Dassier was sent to Paris for instruction from the silversmith Thomas Germain. In 1736 he went to Italy. He stayed at Rome for one year (1737), studied art, and made a medal of Pope Clement XII. At Turin he took the portrait of the king of Sardinia in wax, completing it as a medal on his return to Geneva, where he stayed for some time as an assistant to his father.

In 1740 Dassier went to England, In 1741 he was appointed assistant engraver to the Royal Mint, with a salary and lodging: the duties were light. He visited Geneva in 1743 (again in 1745) and, on his way, in Paris, made a wax portrait of Montesquieu from the life, producing a medal from it in 1753.

About 1756, George II permitted Dassier leave England for St. Petersburg, where he worked on the coinage of the Empress Elizabeth, and made medals of Count Schouwalov and of the Empress. During his three years' stay his health worsened, and he was returning to England, when he died at Copenhagen, in the house of Count Bernstorf, on 2 October 1759.

== Works ==
At the beginning of his time in England, Dassier printed proposals for making medals of 13 distinguished living Englishmen by subscription. This series, with subjects largely from Whig political and Royal Society circles, was carried out 1740–1744. The dies were engraved in London, then the medals were struck off at Geneva.

The table below lists all Dassier's English medals; they have a bust for the obverse, and normally, for the reverse, an inscription in an ornamental border. (The original 13 candidates had Richard Mead in place of the Duke of Marlborough, the other 12 being Argyll, Barker, Barnard, Carteret, Chesterfield, Folkes, Halley, de Moivre, Pope, Pulteney, Sloane, Walpole.)

Date	Obverse	Subject	Reverse
1740		Martin Folkes	
1741		Abraham de Moivre	
1741		Alexander Pope	
1742		Charles Spencer, 3rd Duke of Marlborough	
1742		William Windham	"Officii et augurii causa fecit J. Dassier"
1743		John Campbell, 2nd Duke of Argyll	
1743		Philip Stanhope, 4th Earl of Chesterfield	
1743		Ralph Brideoake the younger	1722 Church of St Mary Southampton
1744		Robert Barker	
1744		Sir John Barnard	
1744		John Carteret, 2nd Earl Granville	
1744		Sir Andrew Fountaine	
1744		Edmund Halley	
1744		William Pulteney, 1st Earl of Bath	
1744		Sir Hans Sloane	
1744		Sir Robert Walpole	
1750	Bust of George II	"State of England" medal	Britannia, Mercury, &c.
1750?		Frederick, Prince of Wales	Genii supporting coronet
1751		John Montagu, 2nd Duke of Montagu	Good Samaritan

Dassier was less prolific than his father. On the other hand, the initial portrait series has been considered "perhaps the most accomplished medals produced in England during the eighteenth century". Dassier's signatures were I. (or J.) A. Dassier; I. Dassier (rare); Ja. Ant. Dassier; A. Dassier; A. Das.
