= Robert Barker (physician) =

18th-century British physician and inventor

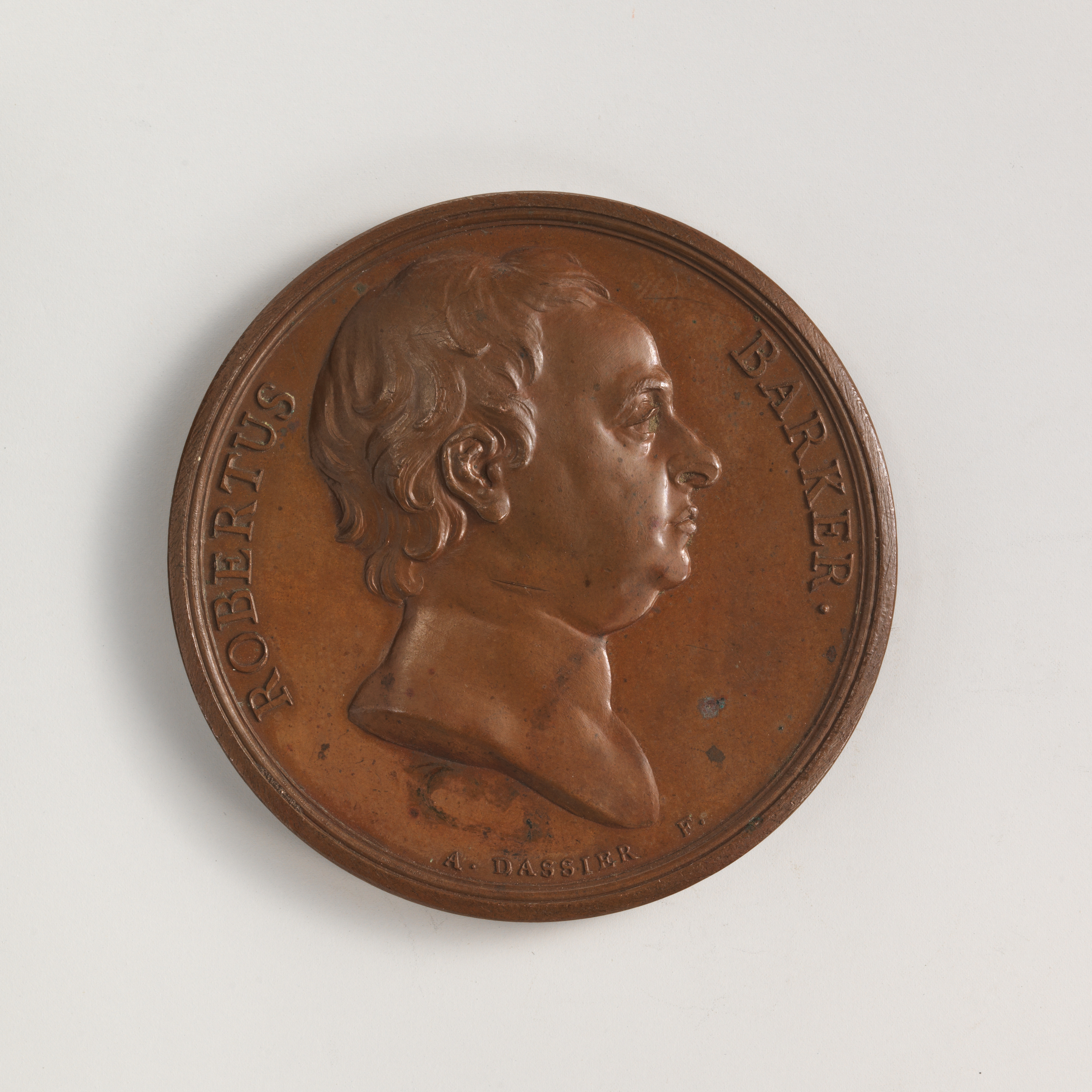
Robert Barker, 1744 medal by Jacques-Antoine Dassier, the reverse side mentioning his membership of the Royal Society

Robert Barker (died 1745) was a British physician and inventor. He was a Fellow of the Royal Society from 1732.

Barker invented both a reflecting microscope, exhibited in 1736, and "Barker's mill", a prototype reaction turbine (1743). According to James Dodson, he was a friend of Charles Labelye. He died in London, on 9 September 1745.

== Barker's Mill ==
Barker's Mill, a rotating device powered by water and Newton's third law, is sometimes described as a 17th-century invention. It is attributed to Dr Robert Barker F.R.S., in 1743. It was published by John Theophilus Desaguliers in his book Experimental Philosophy of 1744. Desaguliers, who himself demonstrated the mill to the Royal Society, attributed the principle involved to Antoine Parent. French terms for the mill are tourniquet hydraulique, moulin de Parent or roue à réaction.

A complex timeline of development ensued.

- As the Segner wheel, practical application of the idea is often credited to Johann Andreas Segner (1750).
- Leonhard Euler with the Euler wheel of 1754 developed Segner's concept.
- James Ferguson the lecturer notices in 1767 "a model of Dr. Barker's water mill".
- c.1790 James Rumsey had an "improvement upon Dr. Barker's mill: a mode to allow circular or retrograde motion mills with a smaller quantity of water to be moved or turned".
- 1827 water turbine of Benoît Fourneyron.
- In 1839 James Whitelaw and James Stirrat of Paisley obtained a patent for a water turbine based on "Barker's Mill".
