= Ralph Brideoake =

English clergyman (1612/13–1678)

The Right Reverend Ralph Brideoake
- Bishop of Chichester
- Church: Church of England
- Diocese: Diocese of Chichester
- In office: 1675–1678
- Predecessor: Peter Gunning
- Successor: Guy Carleton
- Previous post: Dean of Salisbury

Orders
- Consecration: 18 April 1675 by Gilbert Sheldon

Personal details
- Born: 1612 (NS 1613) Cheetham Hill, Manchester, Lancashire, England
- Died: 5 October 1678
- Buried: St. George's Chapel, Windsor Castle
- Denomination: Anglican
- Parents: Richard Brideoake, or Briddock and Cicely Booth
- Spouse: Mary Saltonstall
- Children: Ralph Brideoake
- Education: Manchester Grammar School; Brasenose College, Oxford

Ralph Brideoake (1612/13–1678) was an English clergyman, who became Bishop of Chichester.

== Life ==
Born in Cheetham Hill, Manchester, and baptised on 31 January 1612 (NS 1613) at the Collegiate Church, Manchester, Brideoake graduated from Brasenose College, Oxford with a BA in 1634, and made a MA by Charles I of England in 1636. During the 1630s, Brideoake attempted to write poetry.

Beginning in 1638, Brideoake was High Master at Manchester Free School, but lost the position because of his Royalist affiliation. He became chaplain to James Stanley, 7th Earl of Derby, a Royalist leader, and was besieged at Lathom House (near Ormskirk, Lancashire) with Stanley's family in 1644. He interceded, unsuccessfully, with William Lenthall, Speaker of Parliament, for a stay of the execution of the captured Earl, in 1651. Brideoake then became chaplain to Lenthall.

Brideoake was Vicar of Witney from 1654. On the Restoration, he became Rector of Standish in 1660, Dean of Salisbury in 1667, and Bishop of Chichester in 1675. During this time he had some connection with the almshouses at Heytesbury, within Salisbury diocese, for he bought a mill at Chirton on behalf of the charity in 1671.

In 1660 he was appointed Canon of the eleventh stall at St George's Chapel, Windsor Castle, a position he held until 1678. He died on 5 October 1678 and is buried in St. George's Chapel, Windsor Castle. His monument was sculpted by William Bird of Oxford.

== Notes ==
Church of England titles
Preceded by Richard Baylie	Dean of Salisbury; 1667–1675	Succeeded by Thomas Pierce
Preceded by Peter Gunning	Bishop of Chichester; 1675–1678	Succeeded by Guy Carleton
