= Hospital of St Mary Magdalene, Bawtry =

Coordinates: 53.4302°N 1.0229°W

Hospital of St Mary Magdalene

Geography
- Location: Bawtry, England, United Kingdom

History
- Founded: 13th Century
- Closed: 1930

Links
- Lists: Hospitals in England

The Hospital of St Mary Magdalene, Bawtry was a charity established in Bawtry in the thirteenth century. The surviving chapel building is now a masonic lodge and Grade II listed.

== History ==
It was probably in the episcopacy of Geoffrey Plantagenet or his immediate predecessor, that the foundation of St. Mary Magdalene was laid, and it has remained under patronage of the Archbishop of York up to the present time. (1891) ..... in the year 1289 the first recorded name if its incumbents occurs, The Rev.THomas langtoft.

The exact date of the foundation of the hospital is uncertain but it was in existence by the end of the thirteenth century. The patronage for the appointment of the Master was in the hands of the Archbishops of York. Archbishop William de Wickwane granted permission for Gilbert and his wife to live in the hospital in 1281.

In 1390, Robert Morton extended the foundation by granting Nostell Priory a sum of money which was to be used to fund a chaplain to the Hospital. On his death in 1396 a sum of money was also left directly to the hospital.

The purpose of the hospital was as a place of residence for the poor.

It survived the dissolution of the monasteries but through the lack of care of subsequent masters, by 1834 the chapel was derelict. It was restored in 1839 by Mr. Edward Harwood Greaves of Hesley Hall.

The chapel fell into disuse again in the 1920s and was converted into a masonic lodge in 1930 when the almshouses were demolished.

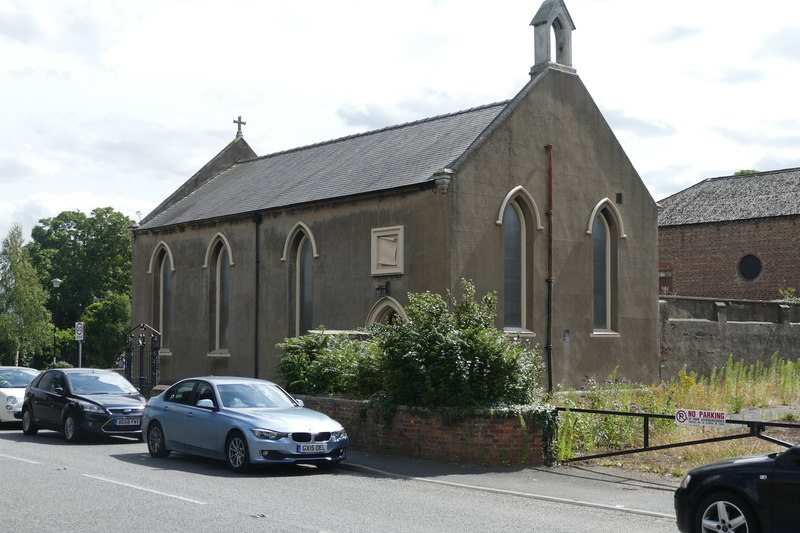
Former chapel

== Masters of Bawtry Hospital ==
- Roger, 1280
- Thomas de Langtoft, 1289
- Roger, 1299
- Adam Usflet, c. 1320
- Elyas de Thoreston, resigned 1361
- John de Grandle, 1361
- Henry Barton, resigned 1363
- Roger de Nassington, 1363
- Robert del Strete, occurs 1390
- William Myrfyne, occurs 1403
- Roger Malton, died 1421
- William Sadeler, 1421
- Thomas Wirell, c. 1450
- John Hawkins, c. 1510
- William Hollgill, occurs 1527
- Richard Pygott, occurs 1534
- William Clayburgh, S.T.P., 1549
- John Houseman, resigned 1584
- James Brewster, 1584
- John Cooper, 1590
- John Slacke, 1610
- Walter Bernard 1643
- John Lake 1674
- Samuel Crowbrow 1683
- Benjamin Day 1690
- John Ludlam 1732
- John Ella 1752
- William Hodges 1803
- John Rudd 1816
- William Henry Downes 1834
