= Samuel Crowbrow =

Samuel Crowbrow (also Crowborough, Croborrow and Crobrow) (born 1646) was Archdeacon of Nottingham from 1685–1690 until deprived of the position as a non-juror.

He was the son of Hastings Crowbrow of Repton, Derbyshire, baptised on 2 November 1646 and attended Repton School.

He matriculated B.A. from Queens' College, Cambridge in 1668, and was awarded MA in 1671, and Doctor of Divinity in 1683.

He held the Prebend of Bugthorpe in York Minster 1678–1680, the Prebend of Wighton in York Minster 1680–1690 and the Prebend of North Muskham in Southwell Minster from 1678. He was also master of Bawtry Hospital in Yorkshire.

He was rector of St George's Church, Barton in Fabis and Vicar of St Mary's Church, Nottingham 1686–1690. Archdeacon of Nottingham 1685–1690.

He lost his position for refusing to take the oaths of allegiance to King William and Queen Mary.
