= Duisburg, Tervuren =

Duisburg
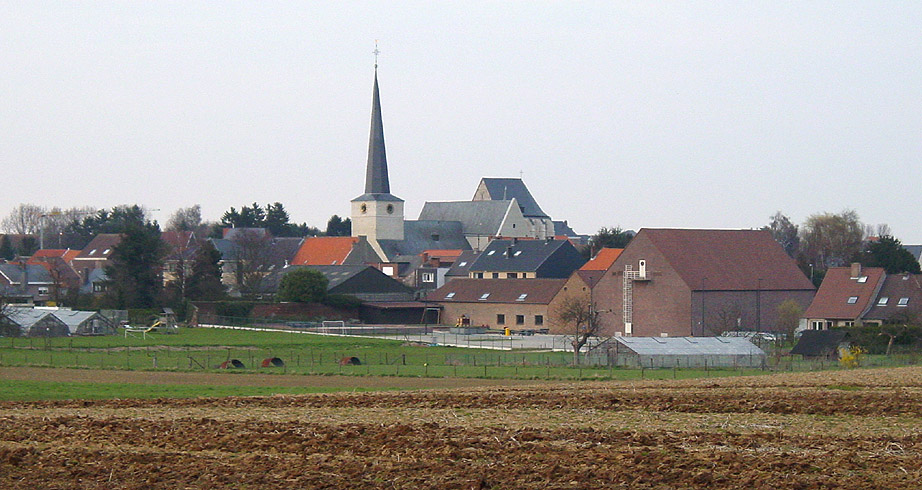

- Location in Belgium
- Coordinates: 50°49′N 04°30′E
- Country: Belgium
- Region: Flemish Region
- Community: Flemish Community
- Province: Flemish Brabant
- Arrondissement: Leuven
- Municipality: Tervuren
- Area codes: 02

Duisburg (Dutch pronunciation: [ˈdœyzbʏr(ə)x]) is a village in Flemish Brabant, Belgium. Duisburg is a part of the municipality of Tervuren that comprises the villages of Duisburg, Tervuren, Vossem and Moorsel.

== History ==
On 1 January 1977, Duisburg became part of the municipality of Tervuren after the fusion of Belgian municipalities. It had been an independent municipality.

== Culture ==
There is a church dedicated to Saint Catherine, the Sint-Katharinakerk, in the centre of Duisburg.

Duisburg is also famous in the region for their annual hosting of the Hallocoween festival near the centre.

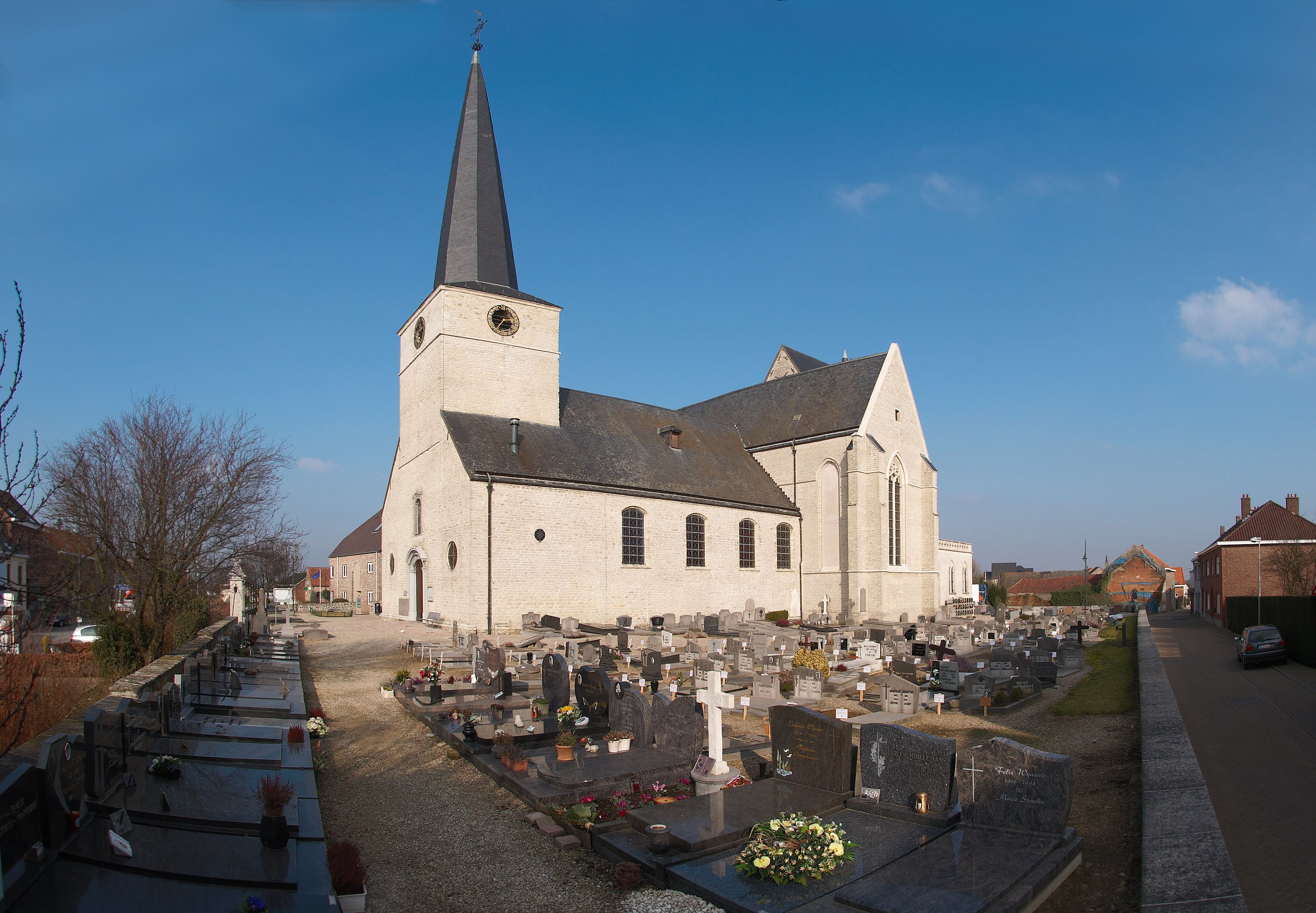
Sint-Katharinakerk, Duisburg

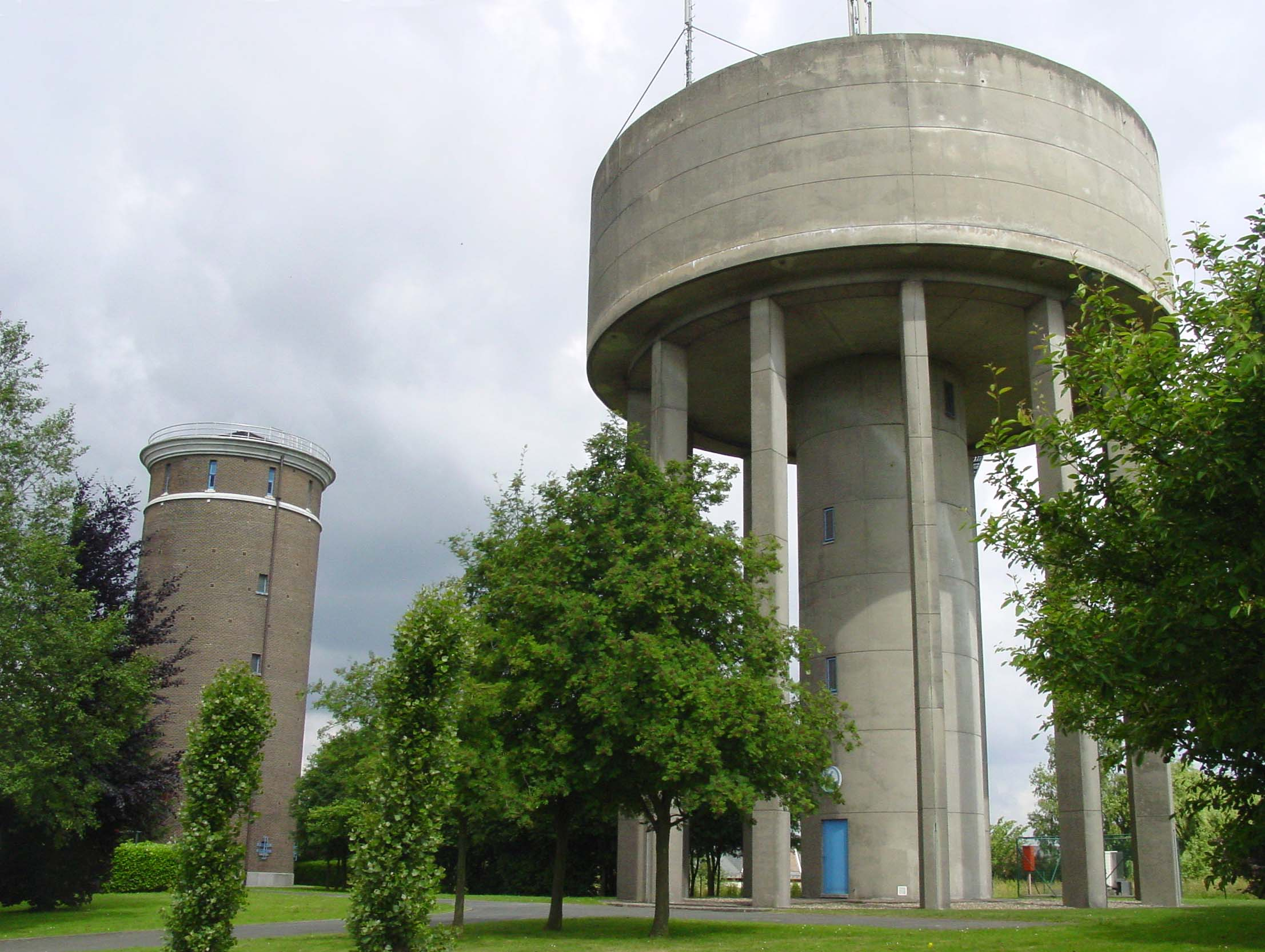
Twin water towers in Duisburg
