= C.E.C.A. house =

Experimental prefabricated workers' house in Belgium

- Maison C.E.C.A.; EGKS-woning
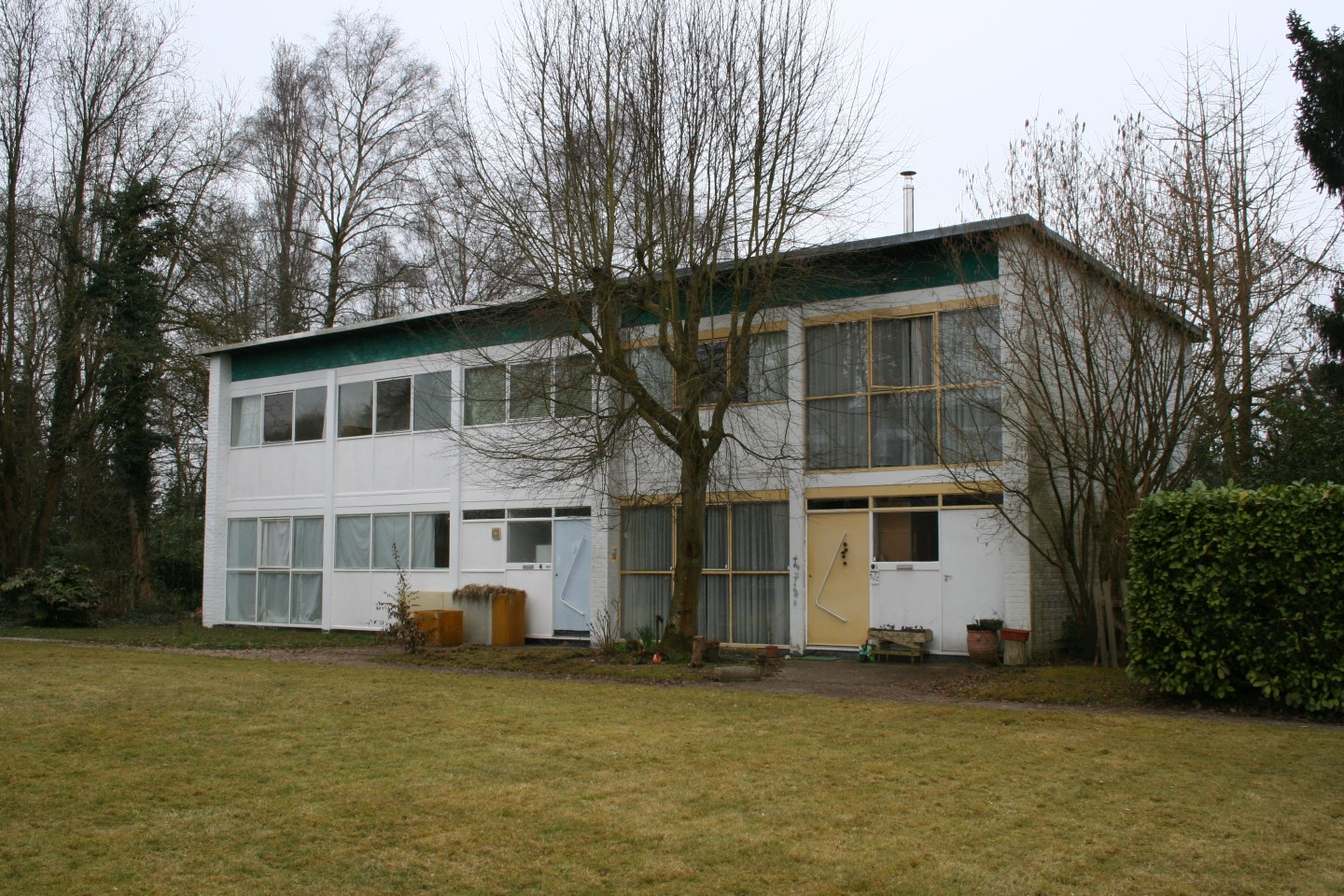
- Interactive map of the C.E.C.A. house area

General information
- Type: Prefabricated housing prototype
- Architectural style: Post-war modernism
- Location: Belgium
- Coordinates: 50.843367°N 4.536380°E
- Construction started: 1954
- Completed: Prototype: 1954; Tervuren development: 1955

Technical details
- Material: Steel frame, prefabricated components

Design and construction
- Architects: Willy Van Der Meeren; Léon Palm
- Known for: Experimental industrialised housing

The C.E.C.A. house (French: Maison C.E.C.A., Dutch: EGKS-woning) was an experimental prefabricated workers' house developed in Belgium in 1954 by two Belgian architects Willy Van Der Meeren and Léon Palm. They designed a standardized model of a minimum dwelling for working-class families that could be constructed fast, at low cost, through the use of prefabricated elements in the context of post-war housing shortages and the social ambitions associated with the European Coal and Steel Community.

A prototype was exhibited in 1954 at the sixth International Fair of Liège and later that year at the International Technical and Industrial Exhibition in Charleroi. It was promoted as a fully equipped modern house using standardised construction and economical materials. Although the concept initially attracted the interest of some 4,500 potential buyers, the project did not enter serial production and only ten houses were ultimately built. In addition to eight C.E.C.A. houses in Tervuren, one C.E.C.A. house was built in Ohain and another in Leuven.

Its principal realised form was a group of eight related houses at Vierwindenbinnenhof (French: Clos des Quatre Vents) in Tervuren, including Van Der Meeren's own house. His later projects, including Ieder Zijn Huis in Evere, continued his interest in social housing and prefabricated construction.

== Background ==
Belgium faced a substantial housing shortage after the Second World War. Architects, public authorities and housing companies debated standardization, prefabrication and industrialized construction as possible responses to the shortage.

The European Coal and Steel Community (ECSC; C.E.C.A. in French) regarded housing as an important component of its social policy. Under the Treaty of Paris, the ECSC High Authority financed low-cost housing programs for coal miners and steel workers for decades, providing preferential loans for the construction and modernization of housing in industrial regions. The objective was both to improve living standards and to support employment in the coal and steel industries. The housing loans typically covered only a portion of total costs and were combined with employer contributions, public loans, bank financing, and workers' savings, allowing workers to obtain housing on more favorable terms. Alongside conventional housing projects, the ECSC encouraged experimentation with standardized and industrialized building methods intended to reduce construction costs and accelerate housing production.

The C.E.C.A. house emerged within this broader European program of worker housing and construction innovation. Léon Palm's 1954 lecture, Immoralité du gaspillage dans les constructions dites à bon marché, criticised what he considered the wastefulness of conventional low-cost housing construction. Palm argued that a fully equipped family house of approximately 100 m^{2} (1,100 sq ft) could be built for less than half the prevailing market price in the 1950s in Belgium. Palm and Van Der Meeren received an invitation to present their project at the upcoming Coal and Steel Exhibition in Liège. Van Der Meeren and Palm chose the name C.E.C.A. somewhat provocatively because Belgium provided the poorest housing conditions for steel and coal workers in Europe. The C.E.C.A. house was presented later that year at the International Technical and Industrial Exhibition in Charleroi.

Although the C.E.C.A. house attracted the interest of approximately 4,500 prospective buyers within six months, the project did not proceed to mass production. the National Society for Affordable Housing, the public body overseeing affordable housing provision in Belgium, declined to approve the design. Without institutional support, the design could not be adopted within the Belgian public and subsidized housing systems and only ten C.E.C.A. houses were ultimately constructed.

By the early 1990s, the ECSC was still operating successive "low-cost housing programmes" as an important social measure associated with the restructuring of the coal and steel industries. As a result, between 1954 and 1993 the ECSC financed the construction of approximately 206 000 low-cost dwellings.

== Design ==
The C.E.C.A. house used a compact plan and prefabricated components. Early versions were organized around a steel portal-frame structure, with services integrated into the construction. The prototype was presented as an affordable workers' house with central heating, a bathroom, fitted kitchen and built-in furniture. It could be produced at a substantially lower cost than conventional post-war housing. A prototype family house was developed at a cost of only 148,000 Belgian francs (equivalent to €37,100 today).

The design formed part of Van Der Meeren's wider interest in standardization, social housing and industrialized building. The house was built around an innovative structural system composed of three parallel load-bearing elements: two masonry side walls and a central portal frame made of folded sheet steel, linked by concrete slabs. Transversal structural stability was provided by two prefabricated concrete wall panels. The front and rear façades were formed by lightweight prefabricated steel curtain walls attached to the side walls and the central frame. Divided into six modular squares measuring about 1.13 m by 1.13 m each, future occupants could personalize the prefabricated elements of the house through different combinations of windows, glazed sections, and opaque panels. The central steel frame served a dual purpose as both a structural element and the house's service core. It accommodated the electrical wiring and heating installations, including wiring, power outlets, heating ducts, and supported the doorframe systems.

Van Der Meeren sought to provide an efficient, flexible and modern living environment tailored to the needs of working-class families. The house was designed in accordance with the standards of the Modulor devised by the Le Corbusier. It was particularly notable for its modern floor plan, developed around a compact 7 × 7 m square footprint and a living volume of approximately 250 m^{3}. It comprised two storeys, each 2.5 m high. Rejecting traditional workers' housing layouts, the ground floor featured an open-plan living area combining kitchen, dining and sitting areas. A multipurpose storage room could also serve as a workshop or garage. The upper floor consisted of three bedrooms and a bathroom with hot-running warm water. Heating was provided by a single centrally-located coal stove, with warm air distributed throughout the house via a simple duct system.

== Vierwindenbinnenhof ==
After failing to reach mass production, the concept was adapted for a small residential ensemble at Vierwindenbinnenhof in Tervuren. The development consists of eight houses arranged around shared open space. Van Der Meeren lived in one of the houses. The ensemble is an important example of post-war modernist housing and industrialized construction in Belgium. Van Der Meeren's own house became a protected monument in 2008, while the wider housing complex was later recognised as architectural heritage in 2021.

In addition to the Vierwinden courtyard complex, a C.E.C.A. house with a metal portal frame was built in Ohain and one caretaker's house, with a concrete portal frame, in Leuven.

== See also ==
- Eames House
- Prefabricated building
- Social housing

== Sources ==
- Cohen, Maurice (2016). "Willy Van Der Meeren's Ieder Zijn Huis: Saving a Fragile Giant". Docomomo Journal (54): 66–71. doi:10.52200/54.A.JG9AW7GL.
- De Kooning, Emiel (1993). Willy Van Der Meeren. Vlees en Beton (in Dutch). Vol. 21–24. Damme: Laat-XXe-Eeuws Genootschap.
- De Kooning, Emiel (1997). Willy van der Meeren: architectuur, stedebouw, design, research, onderwijs (PhD thesis) (in Dutch). Ghent University.
- Inventaris Onroerend Erfgoed (2026a). "Wooncomplex met architectenwoning Willy Van Der Meeren". Inventaris Onroerend Erfgoed (in Dutch). Agentschap Onroerend Erfgoed.
- Inventaris Onroerend Erfgoed (2026b). "Wooncomplex met architectenwoning Willy Van Der Meeren". Aanduidingsobjecten (in Dutch). Agentschap Onroerend Erfgoed.
- Palm, Léon; Van Der Meeren, Willy (September 1954). "La maison C.E.C.A à l'Exposition Internationale de Charleroi". L'Ossature métallique (in French). 19 (9): 439–440. ISSN 0369-7851.
- Swinnen, Peter (2019). C.E.C.A. House: Expediting the Un-private Client (PDF) (Report).
- Verdonck, Ann; Verswijver, Koen; De Meyer, Ronald (2008). "Constructief vernuft en sociale fijnzinnigheid in een kleurrijk ontwerp: de hoogbouw van Willy Van Der Meeren voor Ieder Zijn Huis in Evere (1952–1961)". In De Kooning, Emiel; De Meyer, Ronny; Houssiau, Jean (eds.). Architectuur sinds de Tweede Wereldoorlog: Brussels Hoofdstedelijk Gewest (in Dutch). Brussels: Ministerie van het Brussels Hoofdstedelijk Gewest, Directie Monumenten en Landschappen. pp. 124–157. hdl:1854/LU-762722. ISBN 9782930457291.
