= John Lake (bishop) =

Anglican bishop (1624–1689)

The Right Reverend John Lake
- Bishop of Chichester
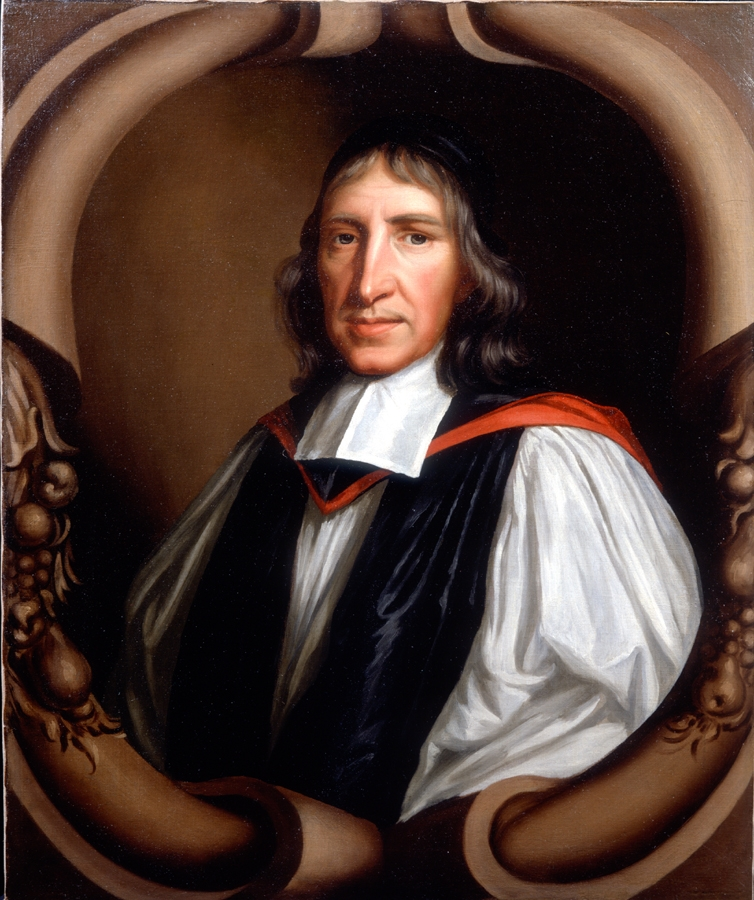
- Portrait by Mary Beale
- Diocese: Diocese of Chichester
- In office: 1685–1689
- Predecessor: Guy Carleton
- Successor: Simon Patrick
- Other posts: Bishop of Sodor and Man (1682–1684); Bishop of Bristol (1684–1685)

Orders
- Ordination: 1647
- Consecration: 7 January 1683

Personal details
- Born: baptized 5 December 1624 Halifax, West Riding of Yorkshire
- Died: 30 August 1689 (aged 64)
- Buried: St Botolph-without-Bishopsgate
- Denomination: Anglican
- Education: St John's College, Cambridge

John Lake (1624 – 30 August 1689) was a 17th-century Bishop of Sodor and Man, Bishop of Bristol and Bishop of Chichester in the British Isles.

== Life ==
He was born in Halifax in the West Riding of Yorkshire and educated at St John's College, Cambridge, where he was tutored by the poet John Cleveland, whose biography he later wrote and whose works he edited and published. He graduated B.A. in 1642.

Lake was an ardent Royalist and fought valiantly for King Charles I at Basing House and Wallingford.

On leaving the army, Lake entered the Church. He was ordained in 1647, and graduated D.D. (litterae regiae) at Cambridge in 1661. He held the following livings:

- Vicar of Leeds, 1661–1663.
- Rector of St Botolph-without-Bishopsgate, 1663–1670.
- Prebendary of Holborn (in St Paul's Cathedral), 1667–1682.
- Rector of Prestwich, 1668–1685.
- Prebendary of Fridaythorpe (in York Minster), 1670–1685.
- Prebendary of Halloughton (in Southwell Minster), 1670–1682.
- Master of Bawtry Hospital, 1674–1683.
- Archdeacon of Cleveland, 1680–1682.

Lake was appointed Bishop of Sodor and Man on 7 January 1683. He was translated to Bristol on 12 August 1684 and to Chichester on 19 October 1685. He was one of the Seven Bishops who opposed the Declaration of Indulgence and were imprisoned by King James II. However, during the Glorious Revolution, he voted for a regency for the Kings's son. He refused to accept William and Mary and was suspended from office on 1 August 1689. Lake died on 30 August following.

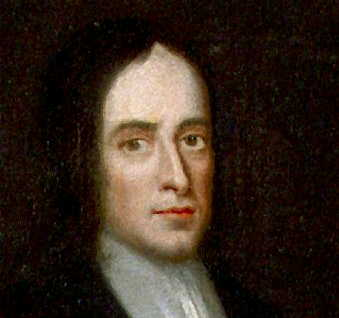
Bishop Lake, from a portrait of the "Seven Bishops".

Church of England titles
Preceded by Henry Bridgeman	Bishop of Sodor and Man; 1682–1684	Succeeded by Baptist Levinz
Preceded by William Gulston	Bishop of Bristol; 1684–1685	Succeeded by Jonathan Trelawny
Preceded by Guy Carleton	Bishop of Chichester; 1685–1689	Succeeded by Simon Patrick
