= Merovech =

Salian Frankish king (c. 450–458)

Merovech *Mariwig
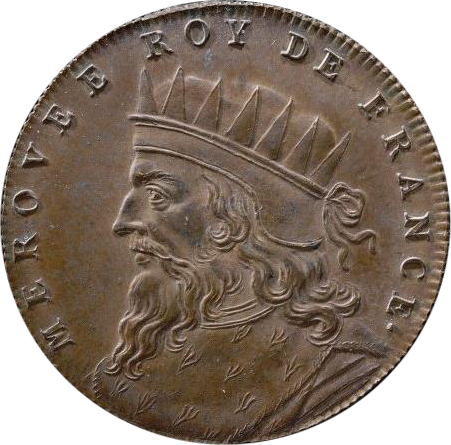
- An artist's impression of Merovech (bronze medal by Jean Dassier), made in 1720.

King of the Salian Franks
- Reign: c. 450–457
- Predecessor: Chlodio
- Successor: Childeric I
- Born: c. 411
- Died: c. 457
- Issue: Childeric I
- House: Merovingians
- Father: Chlodio (likely); Quinotaur (mythologically)
- Religion: Frankish paganism

Merovech (French: Mérovée, Merowig; Latin: Meroveus; c. 411 – 457) was the ancestor of the Merovingian dynasty, and the grandfather of its founder Clovis I. He was reportedly a king of the Salian Franks, but records of his existence are mixed with legend and myth. The most important written source, Gregory of Tours, recorded that Merovech was said to be descended from Chlodio, a roughly contemporary Frankish warlord who pushed from the Silva Carbonaria in modern central Belgium as far south as the Somme, north of Paris in modern-day France. His supposed descendants, the kings Childeric I and Clovis I, are the first well-attested Merovingians.

He may have been one of several barbarian warlords and kings that joined forces with the Roman general Aetius against the Huns under Attila at the Battle of the Catalaunian Plains in Gaul in 451.

== Name ==
The name Merovech is related to Marwig, lit. 'famed fight' (compare modern Dutch mare "news, rumour", vermaard "famous" as well as (ge)vecht "fight" with -vech).

== Historical accounts ==
There is little information about him in the later histories of the Franks. Gregory of Tours only names him once as the father of Childeric I but remained vague about his relationship to Chlodio. The Chronicle of Fredegar recounts that Merovech was born after Chlodio's wife encountered a sea creature while bathing in the sea; according to Fredegar it remained unclear whether Merovech's father was the creature or Chlodio. Another theory considers this legend to be the creation of a mythological past needed to back up the fast-rising Frankish rule in Western Europe.

Chlodio is said to have been defeated by Flavius Aëtius at Vicus Helena in Artois in 448. Ian S. Wood would therefore place Merovech, as his apparent son, somewhere in the second half of the fifth century.

A contemporary Roman historian, Priscus described having witnessed in Rome a “lad without down on his cheeks as yet and with fair hair so long that it poured down his shoulders, Aetius had made him his adopted son”. Priscus writes that the excuse Attila used for waging war on the Franks was the death of their king and the disagreement of his children over the succession, the elder being allied with Attila and the younger with Aetius. As Chlodio died just before Attila's invasion, this seems to suggest that Merovech was in fact Chlodio's son. Historians are divided on whether Merovech is one of the protagonists in Priscus's account:

- Some, like Erich Zöllner, believe that the prince Priscus described was a Ripuarian Frank.
- Others like Émilienne Demougeot believe that Merovech is the king who died in 451, and his son Childeric is the adopted son of Aetius.
- Finally, Christian Settipani has proposed that Chlodio is the king who died in 451, and Merovech is the son allied with Rome.

Some historians, such as Georg Waitz, suggest that Merovech might be a mythological figure, theorized to be a son of the sea (mari in Frankish), implying a god or demigod revered by the Franks before their conversion to Christianity.

Another proposition is that Merovech is a reference to the Merwede, a Dutch river, whose initial course matched the area where the Salian Franks lived, as per some Roman historians. However, etymological studies seem to refute this theory.

Historian Étienne Renard, based on a new interpretation of two royal genealogies from the 9th and 10th centuries, suggests that Merovech could be an eponymous ancestor founder of the lineage rather than being a grandfather of Genildis. According to him, Merovech is an evanescent character, whose name is not associated with any act of war or any historical event.

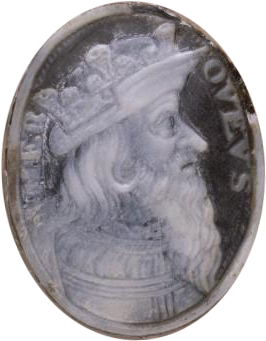
Cameo from the 16th century representing Merovee in profile; National Library of France

The existence of Merovee should not be excluded. An Austrasian genealogy carried out between 629 and 639 mentions that

Chloio is the first king of the Franks. Chloio begot Glodobode. Ghlodobedus begot Mereveo. Mereveus begot Hilbricco. Hildebricus begot Genniodo. Genniodus begot Hilderico. Childericus begot Chlodoveo ....

For the genealogist Christian Settipani, this would be a list of Salian kings in which the lineages were established after its constitution. The genealogy should thus be corrected as follows: Chlodion begot Chlodebaude and Merovee. Merovee begot Childeric.

However the historian Jean-Pierre Poly believes that if Merovee (Merow'ih) is the son of Chlodebaude (Hl'udbead), married in 435, he could hardly have had Childeric (Hildrih), himself king around 456, as a son. He deduces that Merovee (Merow'ih) is the nickname of Chlodebaude (Hl'udbead), son of Chlodion (Hl'udio).

While it seems accepted that bound by a foedus with the Roman Empire, the Salian Franks fought alongside the Roman general Aetius at the Battle of the Catalaunian Fields, (a plain near Châlons-en-Champagne and Troyes), in 451. The sources do not, however, specify who led them into battle. The Franks suffered heavy losses in a preliminary engagement against the Gepids, however history does not say anything more, while it has recorded the death of Theodoric I, king of the Visigoths, killed the next day in the battle.

== References in popular culture ==
The legend about Merovech's conception was adapted in 1982 by Michael Baigent, Richard Leigh and Henry Lincoln in their book The Holy Blood and the Holy Grail, as the seed of a new idea. They hypothesized that this "descended from a fish" legend was actually referring to the concept that the Merovingian line had married into the bloodline of Jesus Christ, since the symbol for early Christians had also been a fish. This theory, with no other basis than the authors' hypothesis, was further popularized in 2003 via Dan Brown's bestselling novel, The Da Vinci Code. However, there was no evidence for this claim that Merovech is descended from Jesus.

The identity and historicity of Merovech is one of the driving mysteries in The Widow’s Son, second book of Robert Anton Wilson’s The Historical Illuminatus Chronicles, first introducing the fish legend to the reader by having the early Merovingians appear in a vision as a hideous fish creature. Wilson then goes a step further by identifying Jesus and Mary Magdalene as the bridegroom and bride in The Alchemical Marriage of Christian Rosycross and Merovech as the titular Widow's Son from Masonic lore, positing that the entire bloodline is descended from alien–human hybrids.

== See also ==
- Battle of the Catalaunian Plains
- Tonantius Ferreolus (prefect)

== Notes ==
Merovech Merovingian dynasty Born: 411 Died: 458
Preceded by Chlodio	King of the Salian Franks; 450–458	Succeeded by Childeric I
