= William Gulston =

Bishop of Bristol

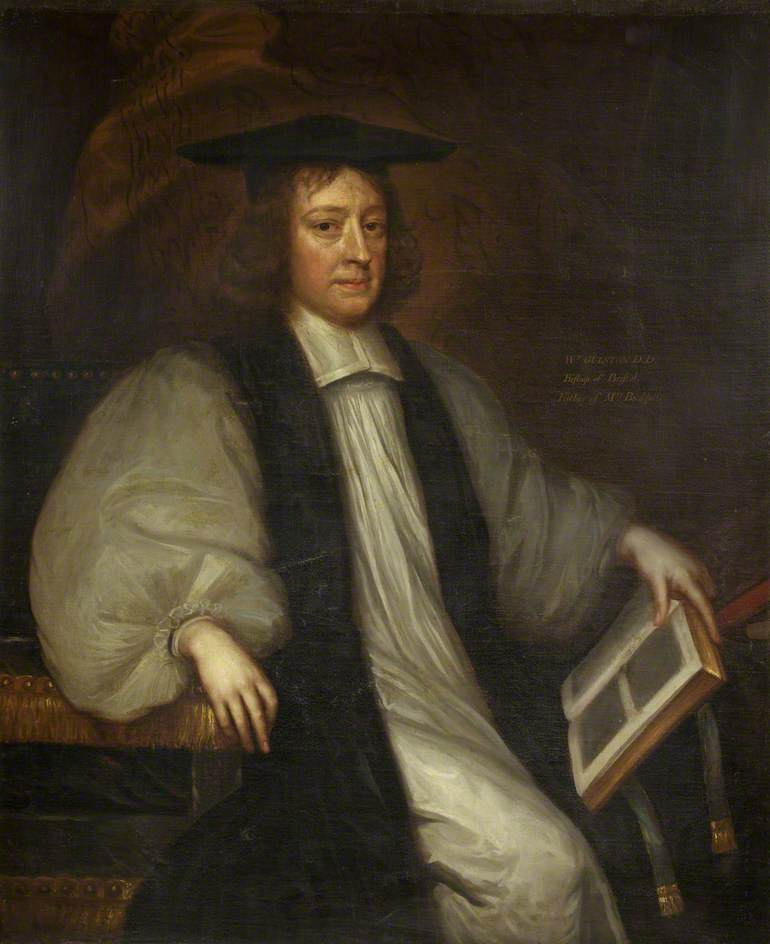

William Gulston (1636-1684) was an English churchman, bishop of Bristol from 1679.

== Life ==
Son of Nathaniel Gouldston D.D. of Wymondham, Leicestershire, he was educated at Grantham and was admitted sizar at St John's College, Cambridge in 1653. He graduated B.A. in 1658, M.A. in 1661, and D.D. in 1679.

Gulston was presented to the Church of St Faith, Havant in 1660 by the king. John Belchamber who had had the living under the Commonwealth was, however, reinstated in 1662. He was rector of Symondsbury, Dorset from 1670. As chaplain to Sarah, Duchess of Somerset, he became a protégé of Henry Somerset, 3rd Marquess of Worcester, a proto-tory, and became immersed in the city local politics of Bristol. After two years his position had become difficult.

He died on 4 April 1684 at Symondsbury and was buried there.

== Family ==
His daughter Mary married Gilbert Budgell D.D., and was mother of Eustace Budgell. He was uncle to Joseph Addison, his sister Jane having married Lancelot Addison.

== Notes ==
Church of England titles
Preceded by Guy Carleton	Bishop of Bristol; 1679–1684	Succeeded by John Lake
