= Guy Carleton (bishop) =

Bishop of Bristol

Guy Carleton (1605–1685) was an Anglican clergyman. He was Dean of Carlisle from 1660 to 1671, Bishop of Bristol from 1672 to 1679 and Bishop of Chichester from 1678 to 1685.

== Life ==
He is said by Anthony à Wood to have been a kinsman of George Carleton. He was a native of Brampton Foot, in Gilsland, Cumberland. He was educated at the free school in Carlisle, and was sent as a servitor to Queen's College, Oxford, where he later became a Fellow. In 1635 he was made a proctor to the university.

When the First English Civil War broke out, he followed the royal army, although he had been ordained and held two livings. In an engagement with the enemy he was taken prisoner and confined in Lambeth House. He managed to escape by the help of his wife, who conveyed a cord to him, by which he was to let himself down from a window, and then make for a boat on the River Thames. The rope was too short, and in dropping to the ground he broke one of his bones, but succeeded in getting to the boat. His wife had to sell some of her clothes and work for their daily food, but they contrived to get out of the country, and joined the exiled king Charles II of England.

Immediately after the Restoration of 1660, Carleton was made dean of Carlisle. In 1671 he was promoted to the bishopric of Bristol, and in 1678 translated to the see of Chichester, but he was unpopular, and had his palace stoned during a 1679 visit by the Duke of Monmouth.

Church of England titles
Preceded by Gilbert Ironside	Bishop of Bristol; 1672–1679	Succeeded by William Gulston
Preceded by Ralph Brideoake	Bishop of Chichester; 1679–1685	Succeeded by John Lake
