= Treaty of Vossem (1673) =

Treaty between Brandenburg-Prussia and France

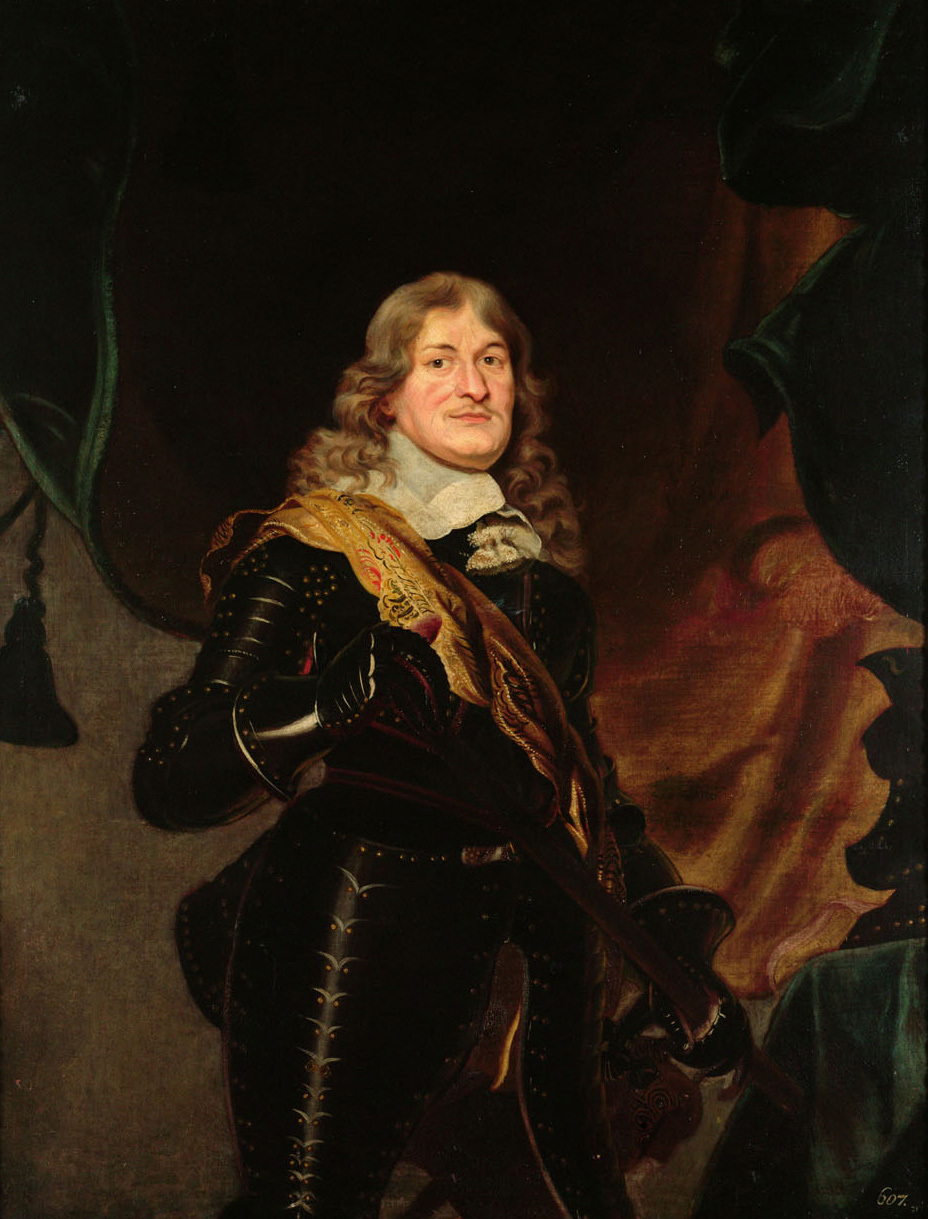
- Frederick William, Elector Brandenburg
- Context: Brandenburg-Prussia agrees to withdraw from the Franco-Dutch War
- Signed: 6 June 1673
- Location: Vossem, Belgium
- Effective: 20 July 1673
- Parties: France; Brandenburg-Prussia
- Languages: French

The Treaty of Vossem was signed on 6 June 1673, between Frederick William, Elector Brandenburg and Louis XIV of France; England, then a French ally against the Dutch, was included as a party to the terms but not a signatory. It was ratified by both parties on 20 July.

Previously a Dutch ally, Frederick William withdrew from the Franco-Dutch War, in return for subsidies and fortresses on the Upper Rhine captured by the French. He rejoined the war on the side of the Dutch in July 1674.

== Background ==
After the 1668 Treaty of Aix-la-Chapelle, Louis XIV decided acquiring the Spanish Netherlands first required him to defeat the Dutch Republic, previously an ally. Supported by Münster and the Electorate of Cologne, he planned to attack across their vulnerable eastern border, using the Duchy of Cleves, a possession of Frederick William, uncle of William of Orange.

Key locations 1672 campaign in North-Westphalia

As French intentions became clear, the Dutch negotiated with Frederick William for the defence of Cleves. He agreed to provide 20,000 men but finalising terms was delayed by his demand for the Dutch-held towns of Rheinberg, Orsoy, Buderich and Wesel. By the time the agreement was signed on 6 May, it was too late for his troops to intervene. He also faced a threat from Sweden, with whom he disputed ownership of lands in Pomerania; the French paid them subsidies to remain neutral but promised military support against Brandenburg 'if needed'.

The 1672-1678 Franco-Dutch War began when the French declared war on 6 April; they invaded on 4 May and quickly over-ran most of the Republic. Rheinberg, the last Dutch position on the Rhine, surrendered on 9 June and they abandoned Arnhem on 16 June; only the IJssel water Line stopped the French advance.

The attack also threatened the Holy Roman Empire, already concerned by French expansion in the Rhineland, especially the seizure of the strategic Duchy of Lorraine in 1670. At the same time, Emperor Leopold was dealing with a French-backed revolt in Hungary and suspected Brandenburg-Prussia of seeking to drag him into war on behalf of their Dutch Calvinist co-religionists. However, by mid June, the Dutch seemed close to collapse and on 23 June, he signed an alliance with Frederick William, followed by another with the Republic on 25th.

The treaty tied Frederick William to Imperial strategy and Leopold viewed preventing French gains in the Rhineland as a higher priority than helping the Dutch. His commander, Raimondo Montecuccoli, was ordered to remain on the defensive and avoid direct conflict, while chaotic logistics made supplying the troops almost impossible. Angered by the lack of action, the Dutch stopped paying Fredrick William subsidies; unable to feed his army and lacking support, he agreed an armistice with France in April 1673.

== Terms ==
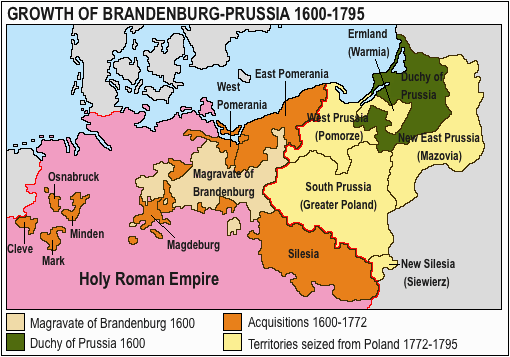
Growth of Brandenburg-Prussia, 1600–1795; the wide distribution of territories exposed it to multiple areas of conflict but made it hard to defend

Terms were negotiated with Louis, who was based at Vossem, Belgium, outside Leuven, signed on 6 June and ratified on 20 July. In return for agreeing 'not to help the king's enemies', the French handed over the forts taken from the Dutch, and agreed an immediate payment of 300,000 livres, with an additional 100,000 per year for the next five years. Handing over the Rhine fortresses was a net gain for France; doing so released their garrisons and the towns could be retaken anytime they wished, while much of the subsidies were never paid.

== Aftermath ==
Frederick William was condemned by his former allies, particularly his nephew William, who never wholly trusted him again and excluded him from the Quadruple Alliance of August 1673. Formed to oppose French expansion, this consisted of the Republic, Spain, Emperor Leopold and the Duke of Lorraine. In May 1674, the Imperial Diet declared war against France, which theoretically bound all members of the Empire, including Brandenburg-Prussia. Mutual suspicions meant Frederick William did not enter the alliance until July 1674; despite taking most of Pomerania during the Scanian War, he was isolated and forced to return most of his conquests at Saint-Germain-en-Laye in 1679.

== Sources ==
- Lynn, John (1996). The Wars of Louis XIV, 1667-1714 (Modern Wars in Perspective). Longman. ISBN 978-0582056299.
- Mckay, Derek (1997). Oresko, Robert; Gibbs, GC (eds.). Small Power Diplomacy in the age of Louis XIV in Royal and Republican Sovereignty: Essays in Memory of Ragnhild Hatton. Cambridge University Press. ISBN 978-0521419109.
- Rowen, Henry Herbert (1978). John de Witt, Grand Pensionary of Holland, 1625-1672 (2015 ed.). Princeton University Press. ISBN 978-0691600437.
- Van Nimwegen, Olaf (2010). The Dutch Army and the Military Revolutions, 1588-1688. Boydell Press. ISBN 978-1843835752.
- Young, William (2004). International Politics and Warfare in the Age of Louis XIV and Peter the Great: A Guide to the Historical Literature. iUniverse. ISBN 978-0595813988.
