= Chlodio =

5th-century Frankish king

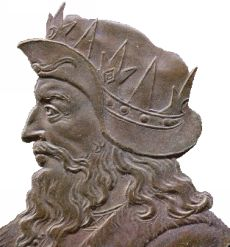
- "'Chlodio, King of France'", artist's impression by Jean Dassier (1676–1763), Bibliothèque nationale de France (Note: This fictional representation does not correspond to any historical reality.).

King of the Salian Franks
- In office c. 428 – c. 450
- Preceded by: Theodemer
- Succeeded by: Merovech

Personal details
- Born: c. 390
- Died: c. 450
- Children: Merovech; Clodovald?

Chlodio (also Cloio or Chlogio), was a 5th-century Frankish king who attacked and then apparently ruled Roman-inhabited lands around Cambrai and Tournai, near the modern border of Belgium and France. Very little is known about him, and he is mentioned only briefly in a small number of much later records. He was alive during the period when Aëtius (d. 454) was leader of the Roman military in Gaul.

His conquests reputedly reached as far south as the River Somme. This represented an important turning point, extending Frankish rule more deeply within the Roman Empire, quite distant from the border regions near the Rhine where the Franks had already been established for a long time. Gregory of Tours reported that in his time people believed that the Merovingian dynasty, who ruled a large empire in his time, were descended somehow from Chlodio.

According to a popular proposal among modern scholars, he was probably a descendant of the Salian Franks, who the Romans allowed to settle within Texandria in the 4th century.

== Name ==
Chlodio is a short form of Frankish names such as *Hlodowig (the same name as Clovis, Louis and Ludwig) or *Hlodhari (Chlothar, Lothar, Lothair, Luther), which are derived from the Germanic root *hlod- ('famous').

== Contemporary attestation ==
In a panegyric written for emperor Majorian (reigned 457-460), Sidonius Apollinaris described how Franks overran of the Atrebates under "Cloio" in the time when Flavius Aëtius (died 454) commanded the Roman army in Gaul. The province of the Atrebates was north of the Somme, and partly between Tournai and Cambrai. Sidonius recounted that Majorian, before becoming emperor, once fought under Aëtius in an attack upon a Frankish wedding celebration at a village named Vicus Helena.

== Medieval attestations ==
Gregory of Tours (II,9) reported that "Chlogio" (as he spells his name in Latin) attacked from a fort (castrum) named "Dispargum" within or upon the bounds of the "Thoringian" land, which is described as being west of the Rhine and north of the Romanized population living in Gaul north of the Loire. One translation of what Gregory wrote, adding some Latin key words in square brackets, is as follows:

It is commonly said that the Franks came originally from Pannonia and first colonized the banks of the Rhine. Then they crossed the river, marched through Thuringia [Thoringiam transmeasse], and set up in each country district [pagus] and each city [civitas] long-haired kings chosen from the foremost and most noble family of their race. [...] They also say that Clodio, a man of high birth and marked ability among his people, was King of the Franks and that he lived in the castle of Duisberg [Dispargum castrum] in Thuringian territory [in terminum Thoringorum]. In those parts, that is towards the south, the Romans occupied the territory as far as the River Loire. [...] Clodio sent spies to the town of Cambrai. When they discovered all that they needed to know, he himself followed and crushed the Romans and captured the town. He lived there only a short time and then occupied the country up to the Somme. Some say that Merovech, the father of Childeric, was descended from Clodio.

According to this account, Chlodio held power in the northernmost part of still-Romanized Northern Gaul, together with an area further northeast apparently already Frankish.

The green diamonds show places named as having been in the Silva Carbonaria in medieval records. The Roman road between Bavay and Tongeren is shown in brown.

Two works written after Gregory of Tours, added details which are generally considered unreliable, but which may contain some facts derived from other sources. These are the Liber Historiae Francorum and the Chronicle of Fredegar. It is the first of these which specifies that Chlodio first pushed west through Roman-inhabited territories of the Silva Carbonaria, a large forested region which ran roughly from Brussels to the Sambre, and then took the Roman city of Turnacum (modern Tournai), before moving south to Cameracum (modern Cambrai). According to Lanting & van der Plicht (2010), the Frankish conquest of Turnacum and Cameracum probably happened in the period 445–450.

== Political situation at the time of Chlodio ==
In the years that Chlodio was active, North Gaul changed from a Roman border province into an area where different powers lived side by side, against and with each other. Formally it was Roman, but in reality the empire largely let go of the region. Aetius, the influential general, campaigned there a number of times, but his influence was mainly based on negotiations, temporary garrisons and his Hunse allies. The Roman government relyed largely on the urban elites and bishops who guarded the order.

In this power vacuum, the Frankish groups moved south deeper into the Roman interior. They were not devastating intruders, but a growing political player who operated alongside and sometimes with Rome. They conquered cities like Cambrai and built their own power base there, without immediately overthrowing Roman city life. With the arrival of the Franks, a new political reality arose in which they were no longer just a border people or foederati, but became regular players in the heart of Belgica Secunda. At the same time, other groups — Alemanns, Huns, Bagaudae — pressed the region, making the whole piece of temporary alliances and local power bases.

== Location of Dispargum and Thoringia ==
This description of locations does not match the normal medieval and modern "Thuringia", which is far inland and east of the Rhine and distant from all known Frankish areas.

Dispargum has therefore been interpreted many ways, for example possibly as Duisburg on the Rhine itself, or Duisburg near Brussels, or Diest, which is also in Belgium. The latter two proposals would fit the geography well, because they are within striking distance of the Silva Carbonaria, west of the Rhine, and close to Toxandria, which is known to have been settled by the Salians in the time of Julian the Apostate. It suggests that "Thoringorum" (genitive case) was actually referring to the "Civitas Tungrorum". This matches Gregory's previous mention in the same passage of how the Franks had earlier settled on the banks of the Rhine and then moved into "Thoringia" on the left side of the Rhine.

== Ancestry ==
In later medieval chronicles, several different ancestries were given, naming Franks who were known from earlier Roman historical records. These pedigrees are considered unreliable today.

The non-contemporary Liber Historiae Francorum says his father was Pharamond, a Frankish king only known from medieval records. Pharamond in turn was said to be the son of a real Frankish king, known to have fought the Romans, named Marcomer.

The Chronicle of Fredegar, on the other hand, makes Chlodio a son of Theudemer, apparently the early 5th-century Frankish king who was Gregory of Tours reported to have been executed with his mother by the Romans.

== Possible connection to Merovingians ==
Although Gregory of Tours mentioned that "some people said" that Merovech, the ancestor of the 'Merovingian' dynasty, was descended from Chlodio, there are no contemporary records of Merovech and this connection is difficult to judge for modern scholars. Merovech's supposed son Childeric I is known from records associating him with Romanized northern Gaul, and he was buried in Tournai, which was associated with Chlodio by later writers. Childeric's son Clovis I also took power in that area first before he famously turned to the Frankish kingdoms that were still ruling in more traditionally Frankish areas.

According to Gregory's understanding, the original Franks living west of the Rhine had different kings in each Roman district (pagus or civitas), but they were all part of one specific noble family, which had included Chlodio. However, according to the Gesta episcoporum Cameracensium, Clovis and his noble-blooded competitor King Ragnachar of Cambrai (a town Chlodio had put under Frankish control) were related not through the male line, but through Clovis's mother, Basina, a "Thuringian" princess whom his father met when exiled from Gaul. Gregory reports that Clovis asked Ragnachar: "Why have you humiliated our family in permitting yourself to be bound? It would have been better for you to die." He then killed him with an axe and told Radnachar's brother Ricchar, "If you had aided your brother, he would not have been bound", before killing Ricchar in the same way.

A contemporary Roman historian, Priscus writes of having witnessed in Rome, a "lad without down on his cheeks as yet and with fair hair so long that it poured down his shoulders, Aëtius had made him his adopted son". Priscus writes that the excuse Attila used for waging war on the Franks was the death of their king and the disagreement of his children over the succession, the elder being allied with Attila and the younger with Aëtius. It has been speculated that this Frankish succession dispute may have involved the royal family which supposedly included Chlodio and Merovech. On the other hand, it has also been argued that the Franks in this story must be Rhineland Franks, with whom Aëtius was known to have had various interactions.

== Sources ==
- Gregory of Tours, Historia Francorum.
