= Ralph Brideoake (priest) =

English priest

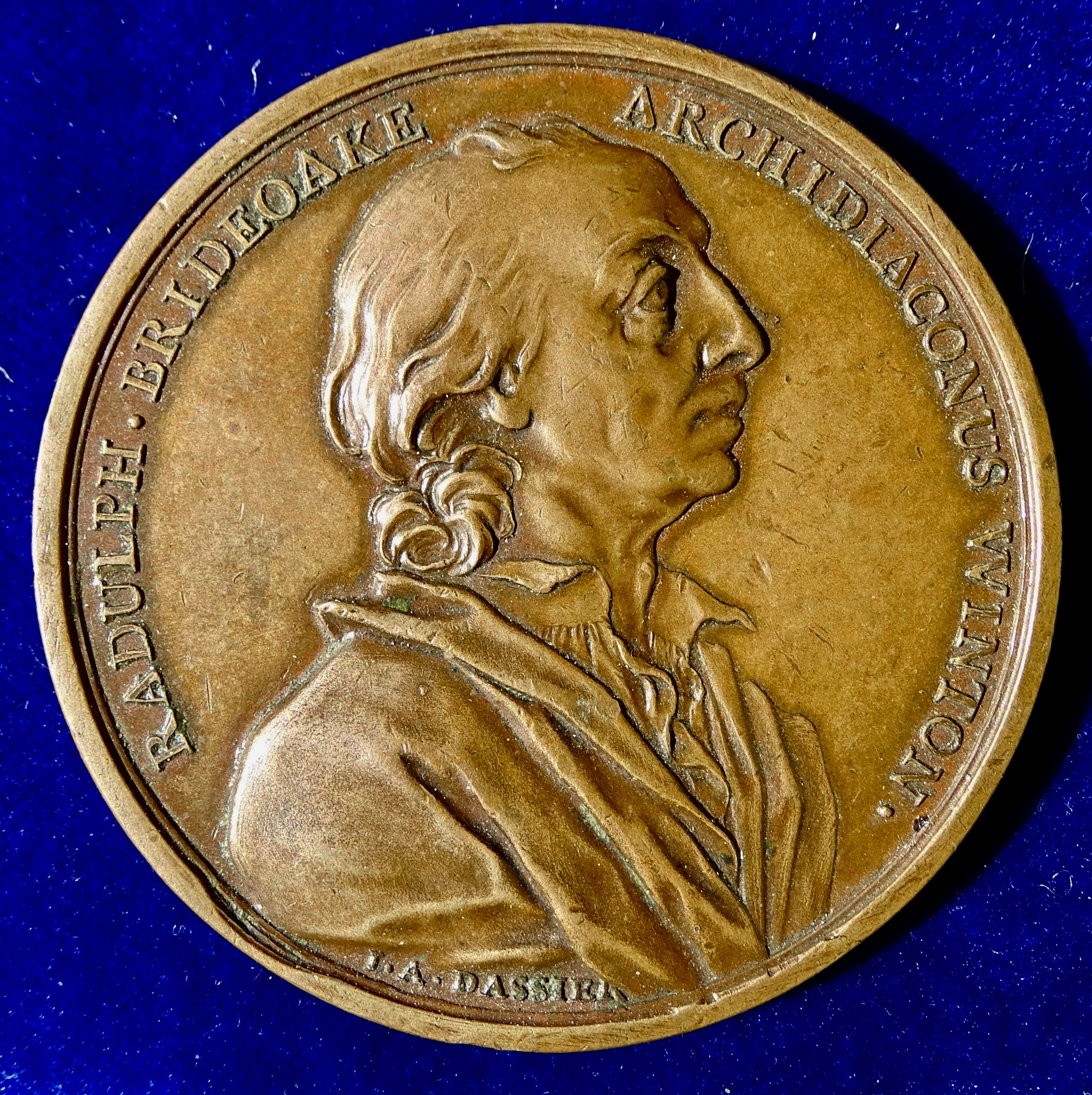
Memorial Death Medal Ralph Brideoake 1743 by Dassier, obverse

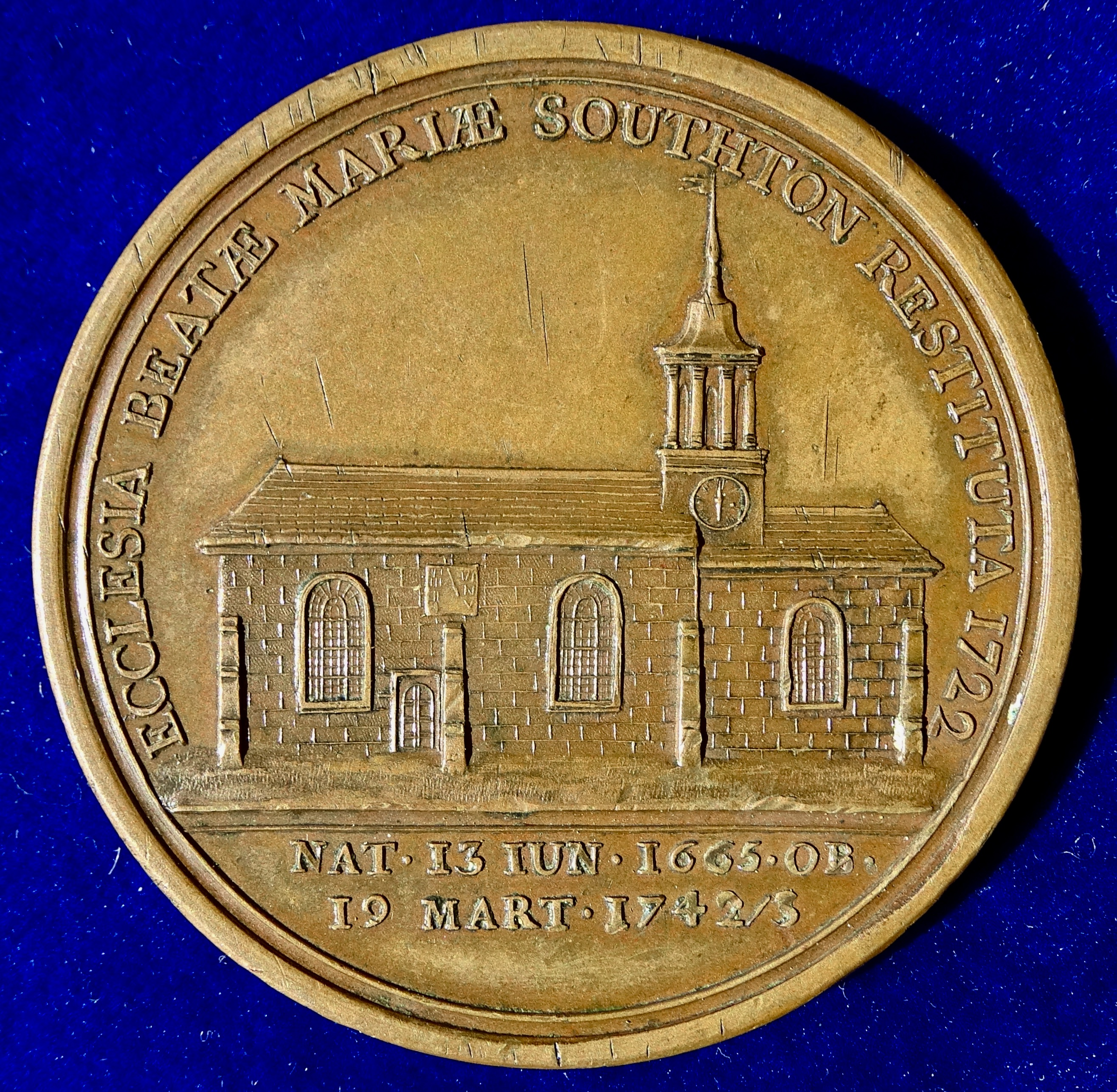
The reverse of this medal showing the Southampton Church St Mary 1722 after the rebuilding by Brideoake

Ralph Brideoake, (b Isleworth 19 May 1666 - d Winchester 25 March 1743) was an English priest in the 18th century.

He was the son of Ralph Brideoake, Bishop of Chichester. Brideoake was educated at New College, Oxford.

He held the livings at St Mary, Crawley, Hampshire and St Mary, Southampton. He was Archdeacon of Winchester from 1702 until his death.
