= Moorsel, Flemish Brabant =

Belgian village

Coordinates: 50°51′16″N 4°32′18″E

Moorsel is a village in Flemish Brabant, Flanders, Belgium. Moorsel is a part of the municipality of Tervuren, alongside the villages of Duisburg, Tervuren and Vossem. It is located 14km from Brussels and 14km from Leuven.
