= Tervuren =

Tervuren: Tervueren (French)
- Municipality
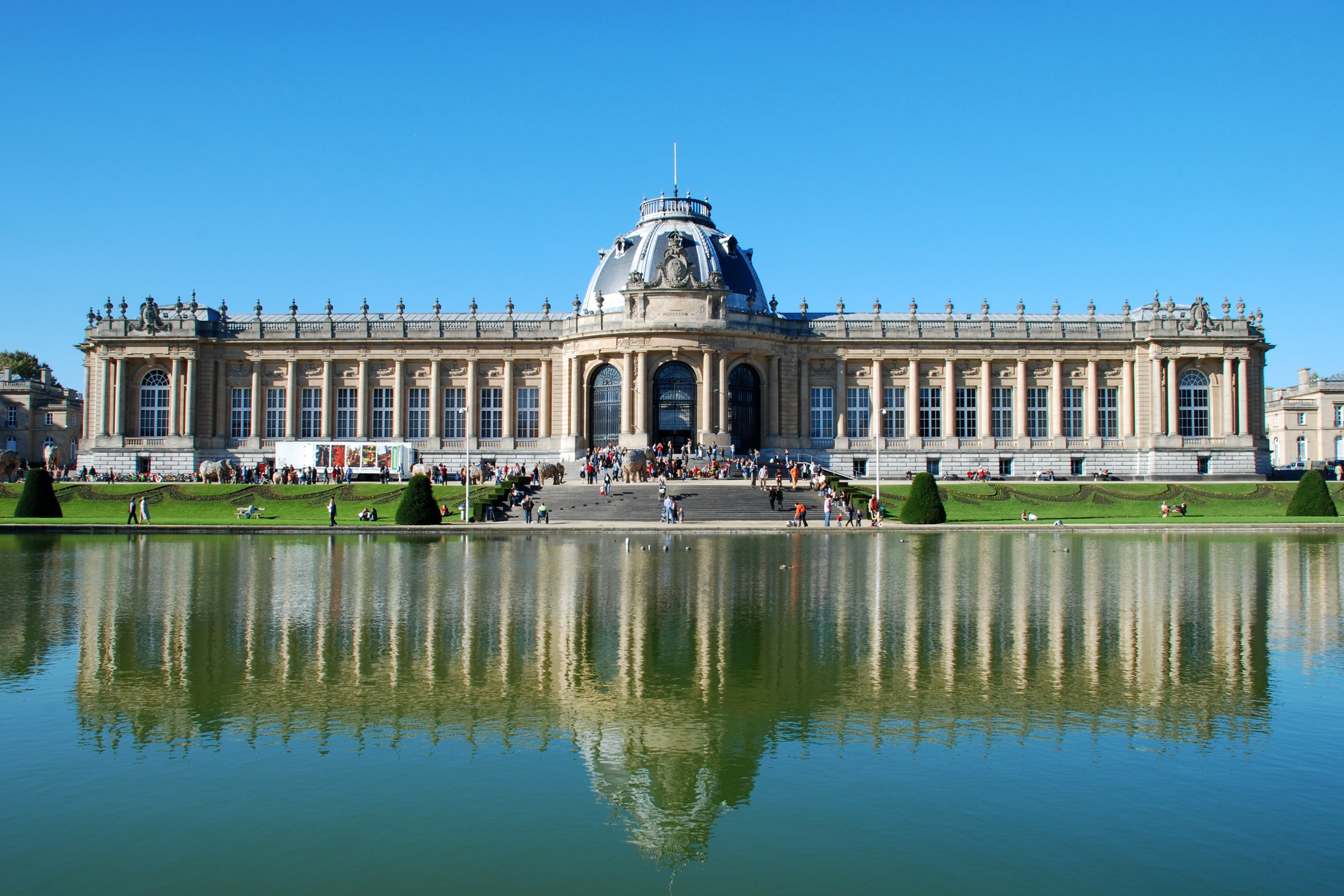
- The Royal Museum for Central Africa (RMCA), seen from the park behind the museum

- Flag Coat of arms

- Location of Tervuren in Flemish Brabant
- Interactive map of Tervuren
- Location in Belgium
- Coordinates: 50°49′N 04°30′E
- Country: Belgium
- Community: Flemish Community
- Region: Flemish Region
- Province: Flemish Brabant
- Arrondissement: Leuven

Government
  - Mayor: Marc Charlier (N-VA)
  - Governing parties: N-VA, CD&V, Groen+

Area
  - Total: 33.62 km^{2} (12.98 sq mi)

Population (2018-01-01)
  - Total: 22,248
  - Density: 661.7/km^{2} (1,714/sq mi)
- Postal codes: 3080
- NIS code: 24104
- Area codes: 02
- Website: www.tervuren.be

Tervuren (Flemish: [tɛrˈvyːrə(n)]; French: Tervueren [tɛʁvyʁœn]) is a municipality in the province of Flemish Brabant, in the Flemish region of Belgium. The municipality comprises the villages of Duisburg, Tervuren proper, Vossem and Moorsel. On 1 January 2006, Tervuren had a total population of 20,636. The total area is 32.92 km^{2} (12.71 sq mi), which gives a population density of 627/km^{2} (1,620/sq mi).

The official language of Tervuren is Dutch, as in the rest of Flanders. Local minorities consist primarily of French-speakers and nationals of many countries of the European Union, the UK, the USA, and Canada. The reason for this diverse mix of nationalities is the presence of expatriate workers and their families working in and around Brussels, usually either for the EU, NATO or for multinational corporations. The British School of Brussels has been located in Tervuren since 1970. Tervuren is also home of the English speaking St. Paul's Church, part of the Anglican Church

Tervuren is one of the richest municipalities in Belgium. Directly adjoining the Brussels-Capital Region but only at the unpopulated Sonian Forest, it is linked to Brussels by a large processional avenue, Tervurenlaan, built by King Leopold II for the Universal Exhibition of 1897, which runs through the town, the forest, neighbourhoods of Woluwe-Saint-Pierre and all the way to Cinquantenaire Park at Etterbeek, and is now part of the N3 road. This interweaves with a combined heritage and commuter tramline. Until 1959, Tervuren was also served by an electric railway, whose disused terminus opposite the Royal Museum for Central Africa became a pub named the Spoorloos Station ("Trackless Station"), currently named Bar des Amis.

== History ==
For centuries people thought that Tervuren was the same place as "Fura", where Saint Hubert (Hubertus) died in 727 AD. There is, however, no historical proof of this, and recent scholarship locates "Fura" in Voeren/Fourons, between Maastricht and Liège.

A document dating from 1213 AD proves the presence of Henry I, Duke of Brabant, possibly in a wooden fortification. This evolved into Tervuren castle, the residence of the dukes of Brabant in the 14th and 15th centuries. The castle was demolished in 1782 under Joseph II, who also demolished the Château Charles, the short-lived summer retreat of Charles of Lorraine. After 1815, the park of Tervuren was granted to William, the prince of Orange and son of the King of the United Netherlands, who constructed the Pavilion of Tervuren, which burned down in 1879.

Tram 44, which travels between Brussels (Montgomery) and Tervuren (and the Royal Museum for Central Africa) exists because of Leopold II's desire to bring visitors from around the world to his 1897 exhibition of the Congo Free State.

== Culture ==
- The Royal Museum for Central Africa (RMCA), communicating under the name AfricaMuseum since 2018, is an ethnographical and natural history museum. It focuses on the Congo, a former Belgian colony. The sphere of interest, however, especially in biological research, extends to the whole Congo Basin, Central Africa, East Africa, and West Africa. Intended originally as a colonial museum, from 1960 onwards it has focused more on ethnography and anthropology. Some researchers have strong ties with the Royal Belgian Institute of Natural Sciences. The museum is surrounded by gardens, with the biggest giant redwood in Flanders, and a large park with lakes. St Hubert Chapel is located at the west end of the park.
- Tervuren Library (Gemeentelijke Openbare Bibliotheek Tervuren - GOBT) is situated at Markt 7. It contains around 43,300 printed documents, and 886 DVDs.
- Vierwindenbinnenhof: Belgian architects Willy Van Der Meeren built eight C.E.C.A. houses arranged around shared open space. The ensemble is an important example of post-war modernist housing and industrialized construction in Belgium.

== Education ==
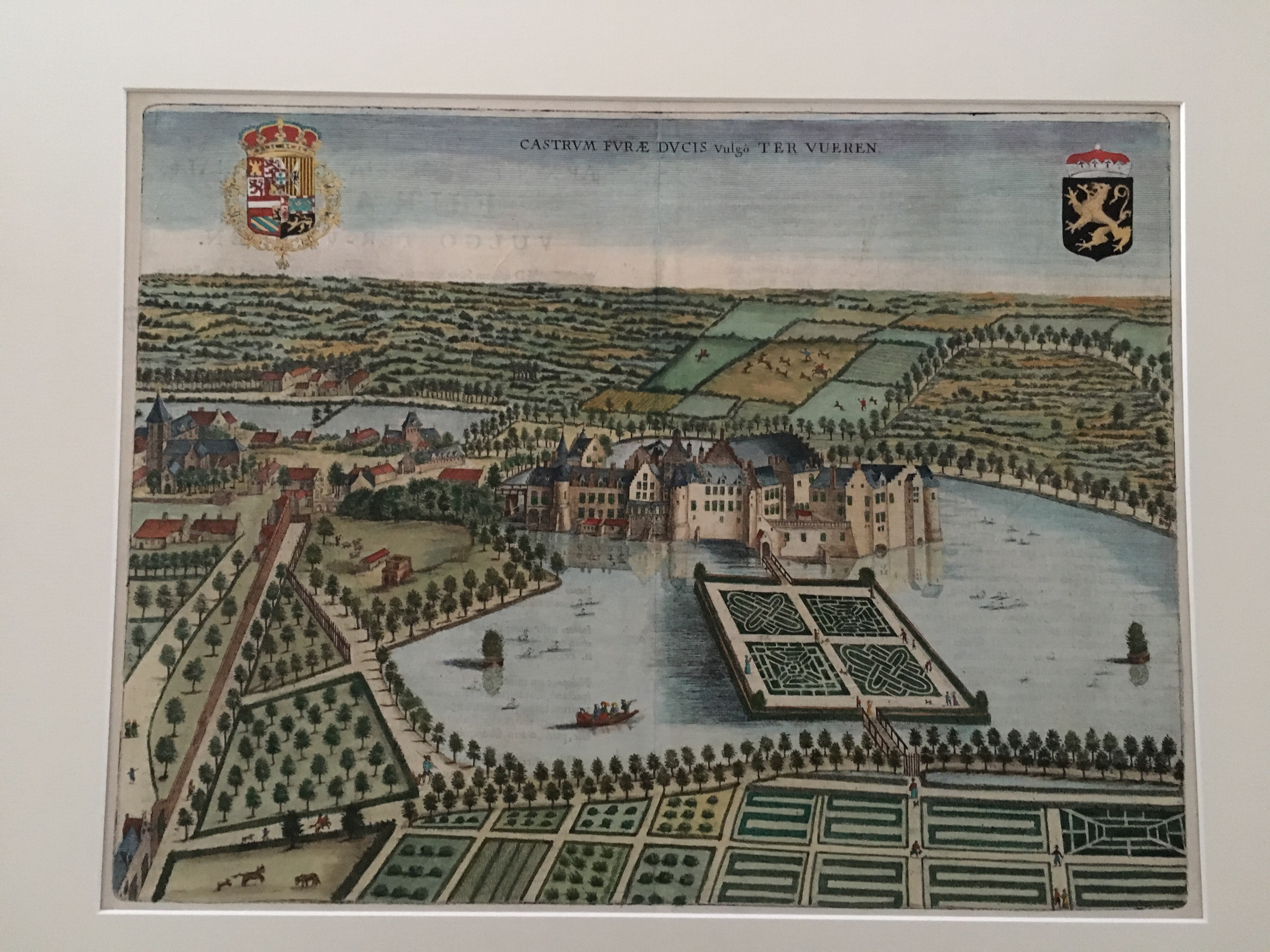
A (mirrorerd) view on Tervuren Castle by Sanderus from 1659

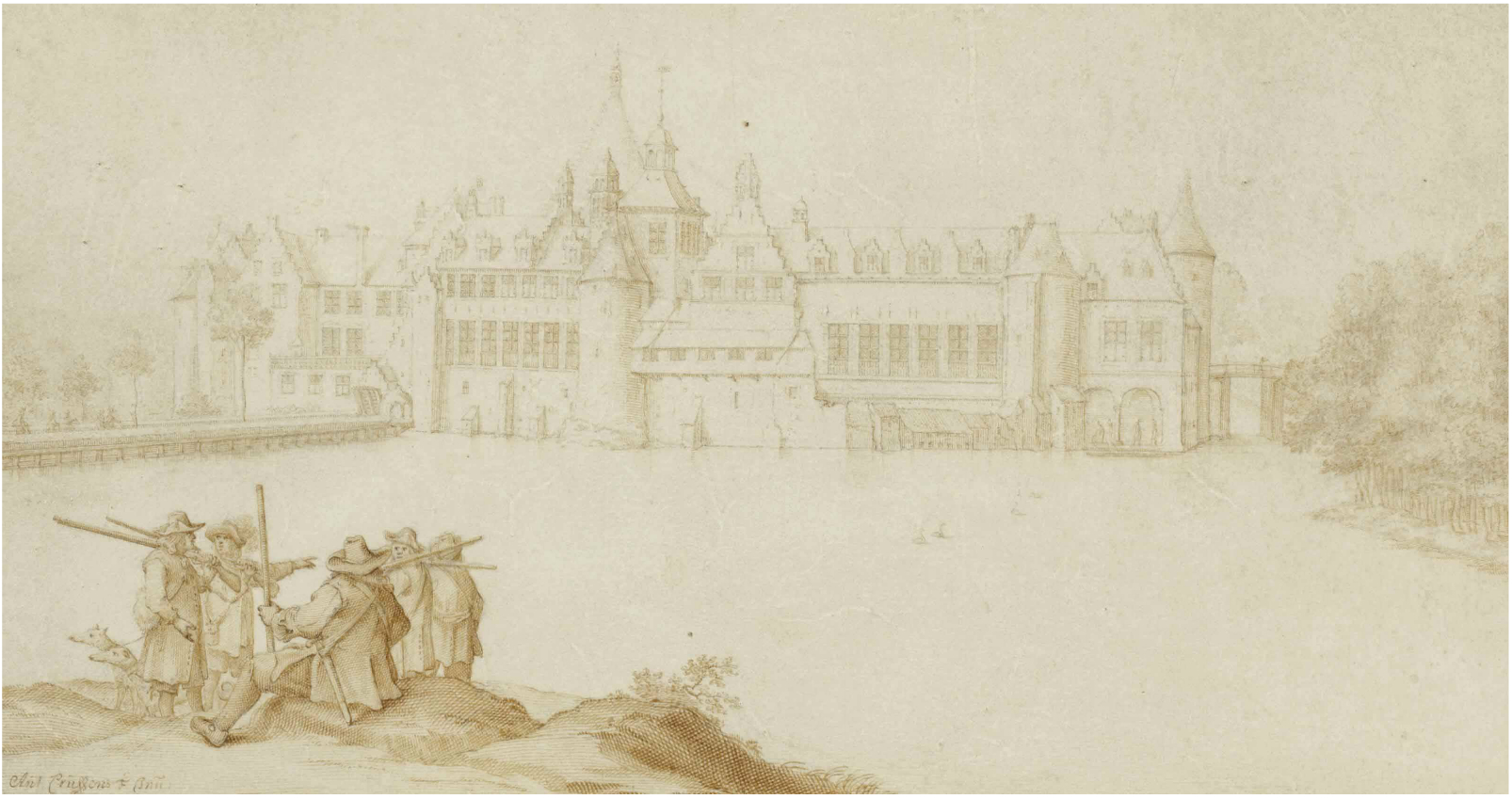
Tervuren Castle near Brussels, by Anthonie Crussens, c. 1655

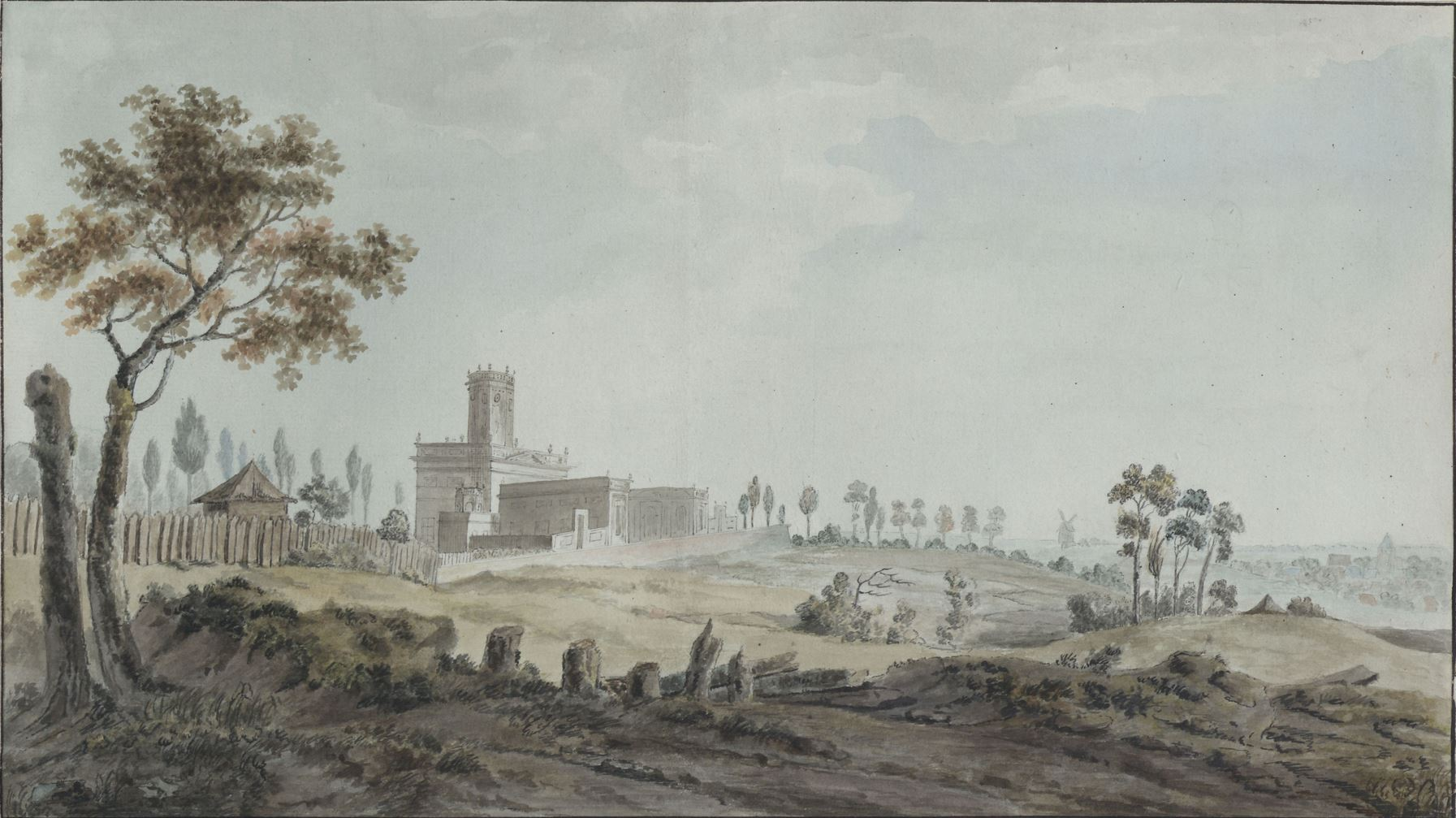
View of the Château Charles

The Gemeentelijke Basisschool Tervuren has a kindergarten and a primary school. The Heilig Hartcollege (HHC) Tervuren has a primary school as well. It also has a grammar school. The Koninklijke Atheneum Tervuren (KAT) is a primary and grammar school. There is also the GITO, a secondary technical school. The British School of Brussels has been located in Tervuren since 1970. There are also several alternative schools including the Kristoffel Steiner School (originally for children 2.5 to 6 years and now introducing primary school education). The Steiner method of teaching is subsidised by the Government and follows the curriculum from the Federation of Steiner Schools in Flanders; Dutch speaking but encompasses and accommodates children from different nationalities.

== Twin towns ==
Tervuren is twinned with Dachau, Oosterbeek (in Renkum) and Kloster Lehnin.

== Notable people ==
- Luc Coene, governor of the National Bank of Belgium
- Ward Lernout, painter
- Miel Puttemans, athlete
- Prince Laurent of Belgium
- Henry Van de Velde, painter, architect, and interior designer
- Christian Dotremont, painter and co-founder of the COBRA movement
- Frank Vandenbroucke, politician
