= Vossem, Belgium =

Coordinates: 50.834619°N 4.55761°E

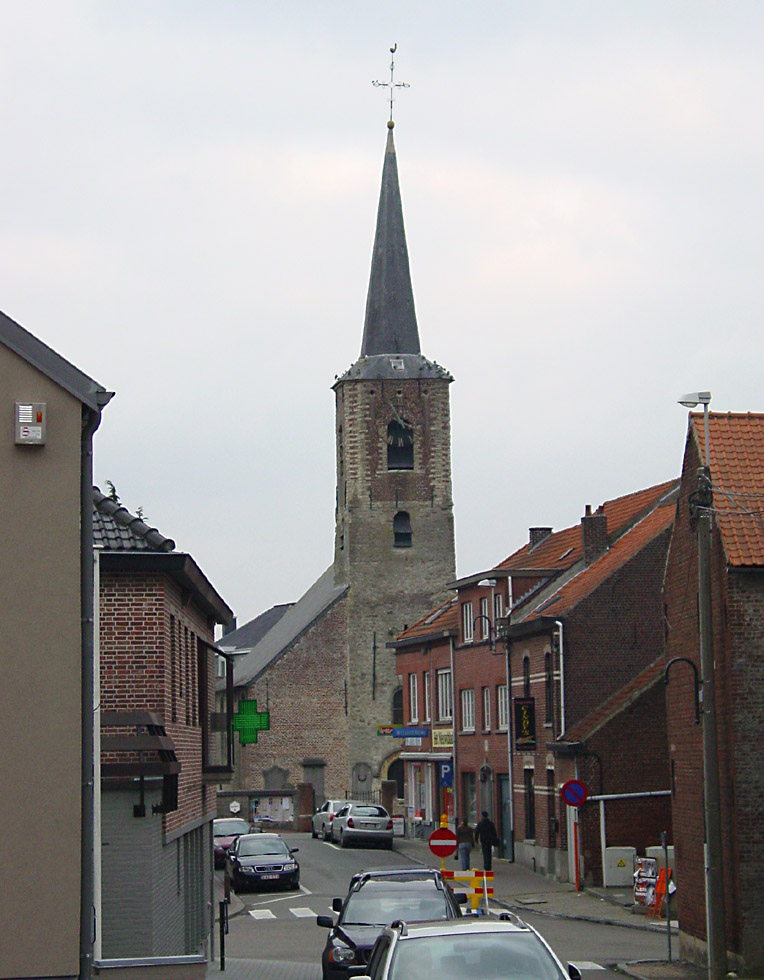
The Sint-Pauluskerk at the centre of Vossem

Vossem is a sub urban residential area in the municipality of Tervuren, in Belgium, 15 km from Leuven, or Louvain. It is located in the valley of the Voer creek (small river, tributary to the Dijle). There is small nature reserve in Vossem, the Twaalf-Apostelenbos ("Forest of the twelve apostles"), a swamp.

Vossem was an independent village until 1977, when it became part of the municipality of Tervuren. Vossem is a part of the municipality of Tervuren that is comprised by the villages of Duisburg, Tervuren, Vossem and Moorsel. On 16 June 1673, the Treaty of Vossem was signed here between Louis XIV of France and Elector Frederick William of Brandenburg-Prussia.
