= Ward Lernout =

Belgian Flemish painter

Edward Lernout (3 May 1931 – 21 December 2019) was a Belgian Flemish painter who lived in Tervuren.

== Biography ==
Edward Lernout was born in Geluwe, West Flanders, Belgium on 3 May 1931. He received his artistic training at the Stedelijke Academie in Menen, where the artists F. Wallecan and E. Van Overberghe also trained. Has been living in Tervuren since 1964, after a long stay in Africa. Although he was employed in the marketing and press business until 1990, he presented annually in art galleries from 1970. Lernout died on 21 December 2019, at the age of 88.

== Bibliography ==
- Art book "Ward Lernout" (1996), edited by Roularta Art Books Brussels.
- Monography "Ward Lernout" (1976), edited by Artiestenfonds Antwerp.

(This book contains a full list of all the press articles published before 1996.)

== Criticism ==
Some comments by art critics :

"The traditional Flemish medium has not disappeared but is respected and cohabits with the new techniques of the fast approaching 21st century. This would all be nothing if there were not, behind each work of art, a man happy with what he is doing, an artist for whom colour is a source of life and life a generator exploding with colour, one more dense and warm than the next." Anita NARDON, A.I.C.A. - 1996

"Clearly, Ward Lernout's talent has reached full maturity. He has no need to resort to attractive effects or play on fashion trends. He has developed a style which conveys to the observer the 'joie de peindre' so evident in this type of art. Lernout is an artist richly inspired by man and nature, which enables him to express his love for rural life in sensual and fascinating pictorial interpretations." Remi De Cnodder, A.I.C.A. - 1991

== Exhibitions ==
=== 1979–2005 ===
- P.A.C. Vaalbeek
- Faculty Club Leuven
- Galerie Tragt and AWW Antwerp
- Alumni and Galarie Zinzen Brussels
- Gulpen (Netherlands)
- Africa Museum Tervuren
- Werl (Germany)
- Centre d'Art du Paradou (Les Baux, France)
- Casa de Cultura (Pozuelo, Madrid)
- Le Roc d'Art (Charleroi)
- Galeries Beukenhof (Kluisbergen)
- Art Gallery Charlotte van Lorreinen Tervuren
- CC Heist-op-den-Berg
- Bremberg Centrum Bierbeek.

=== 1959–1978 ===
- Mbandaka (Congo)
- Wezembeek-Oppem
- Brussels
- Diest
- Mechelen

=== With Mon Camelbeke ===
With his brother-in-law, the artist Mon Camelbeke:

- Kortrijk
- Waregem
- Sint-Niklaas
- BRT Brussels

== Awards and selections ==
- 2001 - Selected for the exhibition "Under the Sign of the Plain and the Sky", organized by "Artists' Colonies in Europe" in the "Germanisches Nationalmuseum" of Nuremberg.
- 1999 - Incorporated in the portfolio "Lithographies of 10 modern Flemish artists" (Flemish Art, Brussels).
