= Jean Dassier =

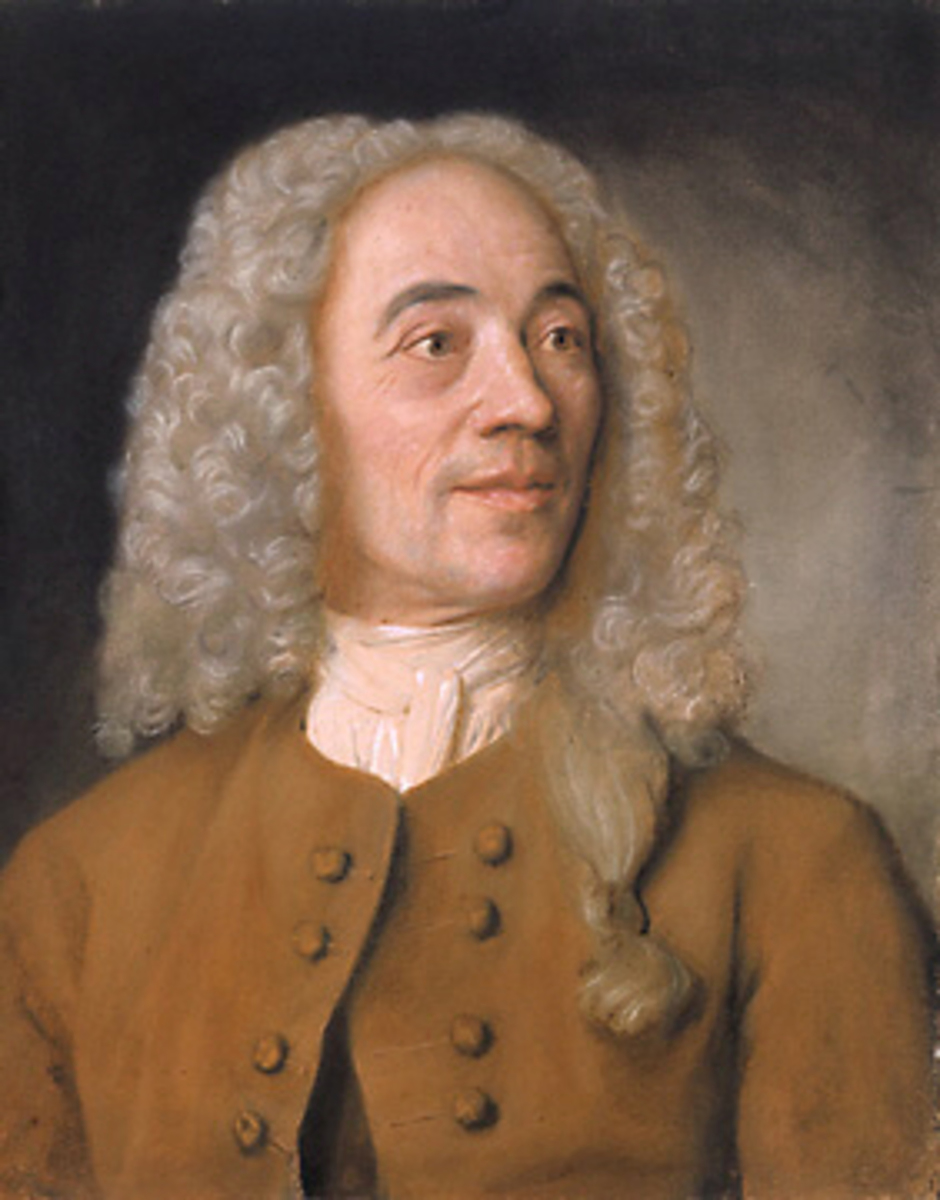
- Portrait by Jean-Étienne Liotard, 1726–1730
- Born: August or October 1676; Geneva, Republic of Geneva
- Died: November 12, 1763 (aged 86–87); Geneva
- Occupation: Engraver
- Children: Jacques-Antoine and 1 other son

Jean Dassier (August or October 17, 1676 – November 12, 1763) was a Genevan engraver and medallist.

Dassier was born in Geneva, and his father was the official Mint Engraver for the Republic of Geneva. In 1703, Dassier married Anne Prevost-Gaudy, and they had two sons. He studied in Paris with Jean Mauger and Joseph Roettiers, and he became an assistant to his father. In 1712, Dassier was admitted as a master in the guild of goldsmiths. In 1720, he succeeded his father as the official engraver for Geneva. He was appointed to the Council of Two Hundred in 1738. Dassier died on November 12, 1763.

On his death, his son Jacques-Antoine Dassier took over as the chief engraver of Genevan currency.
