= Military history of Tsarist Russia =

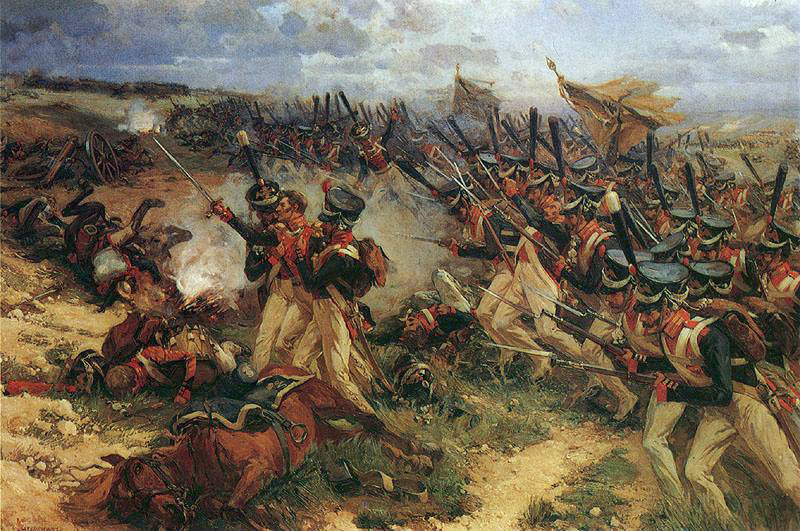
Russian troops in the Battle of Borodino

The military history of Tsarist Russia encompasses the history of armed conflict in which the Russian Empire participated. This history stretches from its creation in 1721 by Peter the Great, until the Russian Revolution (1917), which led to the establishment of the Soviet Union. Much of the related events involve the Imperial Russian Army, Imperial Russian Navy, and from the early twentieth century, the Imperial Russian Air Service.

== Tsardom of Russia ==
The military of Tsarist Russia evolved from the armies of the Rus' principalities that gradually emerged with the disintegration of the Kyivan Rus and the Mongol conquest. As the Rus principalities gained independence, the united armed forces of the Kyivan Rus gave way to personal forces of the various princes. Until the Mongol conquest, Rus princes carried with them a retinue of druzhina, or heavy cavalry that would typically fight dismounted. In the 14th century, the druzhina were gradually replaced by feudal, boyar or prince-headed heavy cavalry units that consisted of landed gentry and were accompanied by kholops. Under Ivan III in the late 15th century, an entirely aristocratic army, known as the Landed Army, was formed for the Grand Principality of Moscow in 1482. Typically equipped as mounted archers, it mostly consisted of nobility and service class people, who were accompanied by armed kholops. At the end of the 16th century, the Landed Army consisted of no more than 50 thousand men in the Tsardom of Russia.

The creation of the Landed Army was part of a broader process of centralization of the military that accompanied the wider centralization of Russia during this era. Prior to Ivan III, the Muscovite military primarily consisted of disorganized peasant levies, and the Grand Prince was unable to compel the subordinate princes to directly place their armies under him, only the ability to call them to arms. The shift began under Ivan III's predecessor, Vasily II, during the Muscovite War of Succession in the early 15th century, and was largely finalized by Ivan III by the end of the century. Vasily III continued this in 1522 when he turned the city of Kolomna, just outside Moscow, into his summer and autumn base of operations for campaigns along the Oka River. Under the Tsardom era, the army consisted of various polks, or regiments, commanded by a voivode.

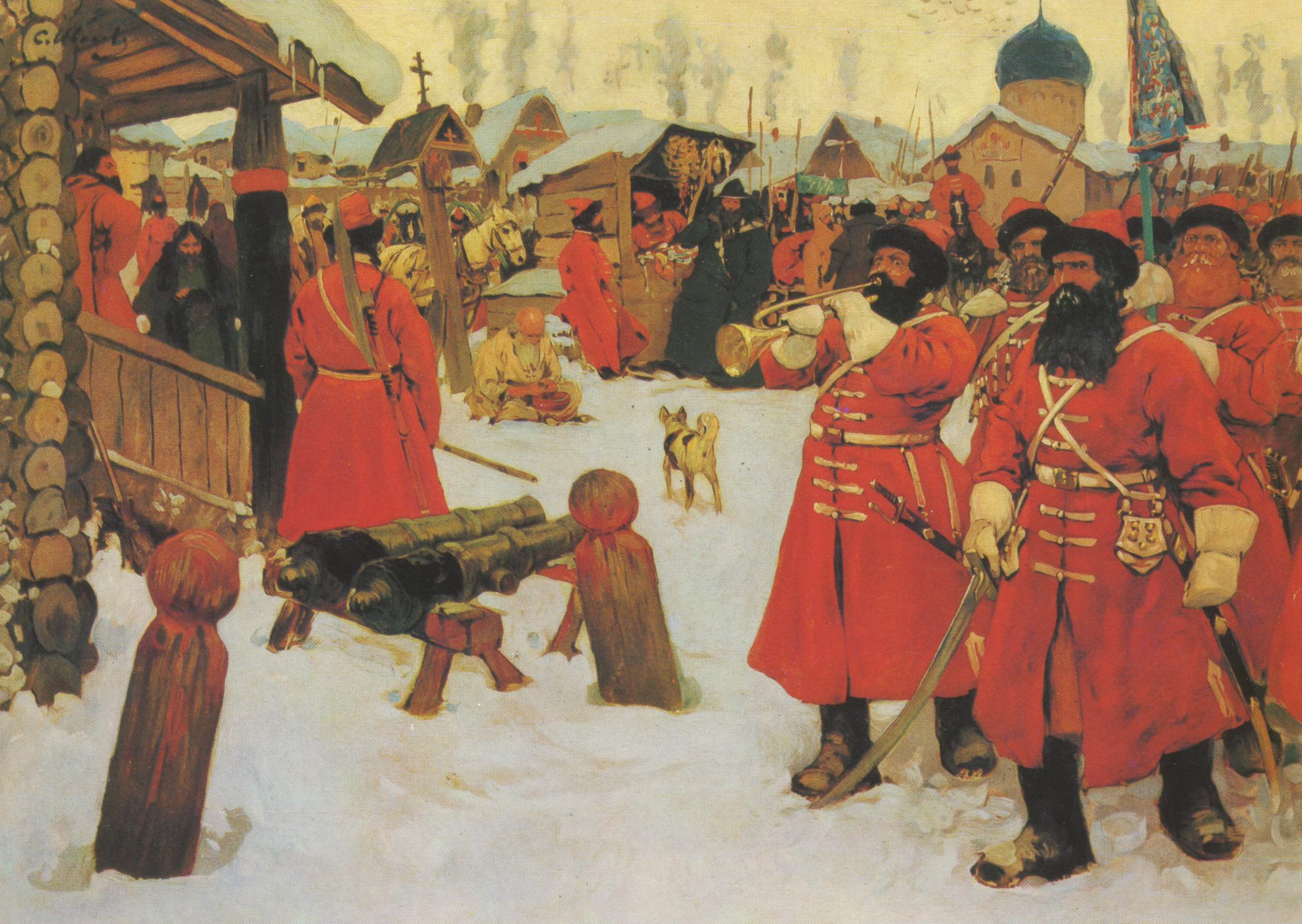
Painting of the streltsy by Sergey Ivanov, 1908

The 16th century saw the Military Revolution sweep Europe, making gunpowder and portable firearms integral parts of European armies. These changes came to Russia, where under Ivan the Terrible, it would become one of the gunpowder empires. Gunpowder warfare had already been introduced to Russia in the form of cannons, which had seen used as far back as 1393, and had seen large scale use after the Italian engineer Aristotele Fioravanti created a large cannon foundry in Moscow. Ivan the Terrible established the streltsy, or units equipped with firearms, sometime by 1550. Initially equipped with arquebuses, they first saw combat at the 1552 siege of Kazan, and would go on to see frequent use as Russia was embroiled in a state of near permanent war for the rest of his reign. The streltsy were initially recruited from free tradesmen and the rural population. They were overseen primarily by the Streltsy Department and consisted of a Muscovite branch that defended Moscow and the Kremlin, as well as a "municipal" branch that defended everywhere else. Despite being an elite force, the streltsy were poorly paid and treated, and they would often engage in rebellions against the government.

At the end of the 16th century, the Russian army consisted of up to 110 thousand men. However, the coming 17th century would expose many weaknesses of the Tsarist army. The Time of Troubles did major damage to it, as the Landed Army proved to militarily ineffective at combating domestic revolts and foreign invasions from the Swedes, Crimeo-Tatars, and Polish–Lithuanians, while the poorly treated streltsy often joined and abated serf rebellions. Following the failed Smolensk War against Poland–Lithuania in the 1630s, a process of westernization began under Tsar Alexis, starting with the general replacement of the Landed Army with professional army units such as Reiters, Dragoons, Pikemen and Musketeers; these became known as the New Order Regiments.

== Imperial Russia ==
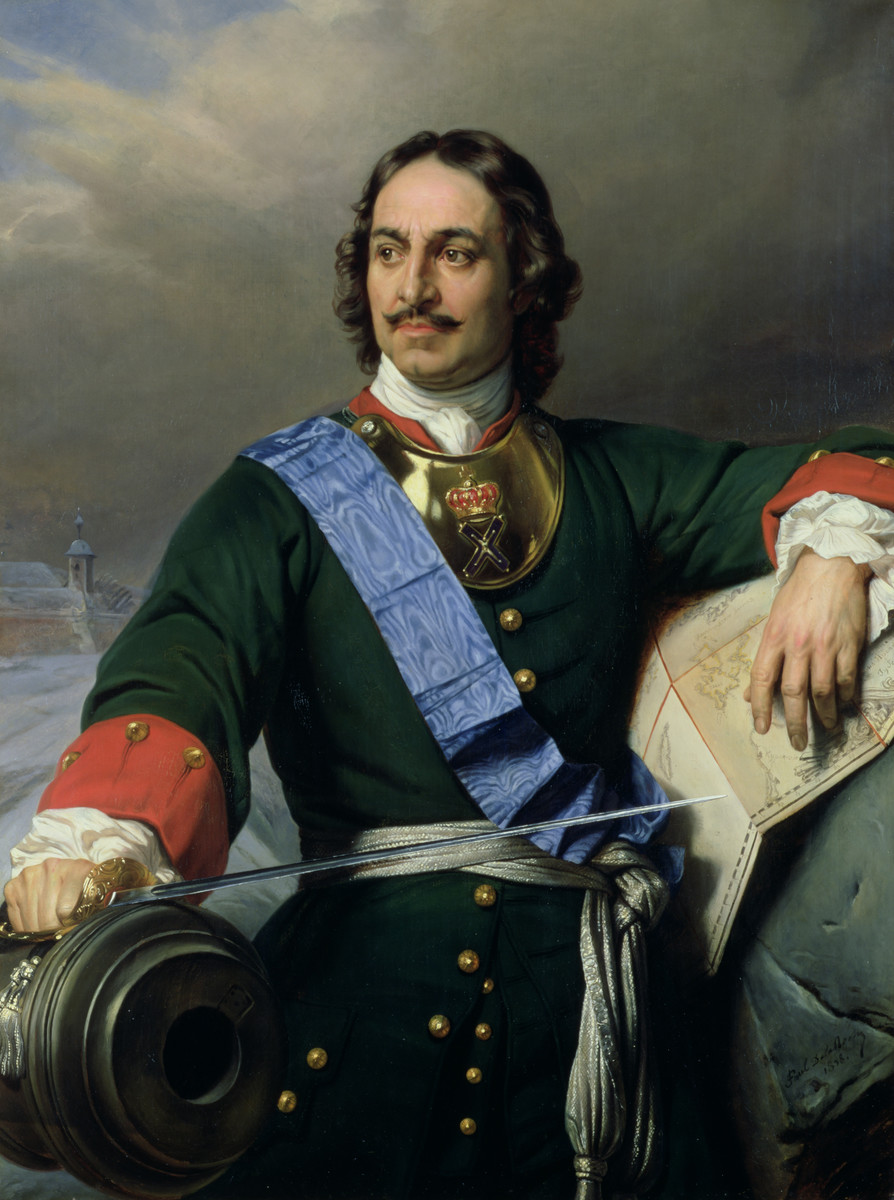
Portrait of Peter the Great by Paul Delaroche

Historians have long marked the importance of Peter the Great's reign in Russian history. Peter came of age in a vast but technologically and socially backward country. Upon taking control of Russia in 1682, the tsar energetically redressed every aspect of Russian government, society, and military to more closely match its western neighbors. He fought expansive wars against his neighbors, squeezing every resource at his disposal to power his war machine, and send large numbers of young men west, to learn the trades and skills that Russia would need in the future. Peter founded a new Russia by shattering the old.

The epoch of Russian history that Peter created has been variously known as the Imperial Age, because of the new connection between the ruler and land; the St. Petersburg Era, as the capital was moved to the newly built Saint Petersburg during his reign; and the All-Russian Period, which stresses the greater hegemony founded in the previously xenophobic country. The period from the time of his rule to the October Revolution (and dissolution of the Russian Empire) in 1917 is also sometimes called the Petrine era, in tribute to his importance. However, the Russian Empire proper was not founded until Peter took the title of imperator (emperor), at the end of the Great Northern War.

== Peter the Great ==
=== Early years and accession to the throne ===
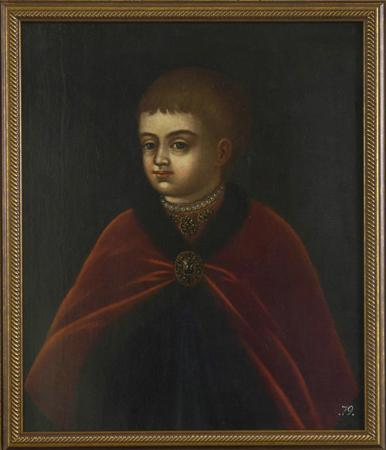
Peter the Great at a young age

Peter the Great was born on June 9, 1672, to Tsar Alexis I and his second wife Natalia Naryshkina. The tsar had more than 14 children between the two marriages, but only three of the males, Feodor and Ivan by his first marriage and Peter by his second, survived into adulthood. Peter was considerably more healthy than his half-brothers, both of which had serious physical disabilities. Peter's father died in 1676, and Feodor, the late ruler's oldest son, was proclaimed tsar. When Feodor, in turn, died in 1682, he left no heir to the throne. With no clear path for succession, the two most prominent boyar families, the Naryshkins and the Miloslavsky, backed different heirs in a competition for the throne. The Naryshkins, backing Peter, won an early victory, and Peter was proclaimed tsar in April 1682, with his mother as the acting regent. However, in May, Peter's able-bodied half-sister Sophia, leading a Miloslavsky-backed rebellion by the streltsy, overtook the throne and killed many of the leading members of the Naryshkin family, the murders of whom Peter witnessed. In the aftermath, Ivan was proclaimed the senior tsar, and Peter the junior tsar, and Sophia the regent. In reality, Sophia took absolute power as an autocrat, shoving her half-brothers away from power.

As a child, Peter, though intelligent, was neither an intellectual nor particularly refined. Physically able and possessing manic levels of energy, he turned his attention towards working with his hands. In particular, Peter found interest in seamanship and in military manners. He formed mock troops with his friends, the sons of nobles and servitors, and staged mock battles. As he grew older, these battles became more and more elaborate, including organized units, formations, and even live ammunition. Once they became adults, the boys with whom Peter staged the fights would become his commanders and closest military advisers, eventually forming the core of Russia's first two elite guard units, the Preobrazhensky and Semenovsky regiments. These two regiments contained the core of the Russian nobility, and became training grounds for young nobles, who served as rank-and-file soldiers to learn military life before becoming officers elsewhere.

As Peter grew older, Sophia realized the insecurity of her throne in the face of a fledging male heir. In 1689, she incited her supporters in the streltsy to rebel again and put her firmly in power again. Frightened by rumors of a plot, Peter fled Moscow. In the critical days that followed, the patriarch and many of the boyars and gentry rallied behind him. Most of the streltsy wavered and took no action, and Sophia was forced, peacefully, off the throne. Thus, in August 1689, he was acknowledged as the effective ruler of Russia. However, at the age of 17, he still had little interest in military manners, and passed on his rule to his mother, Natalya Naryshkina. It was not until her death in 1694 that Peter finally assumed control of the state.

=== Early rule and military reforms ===
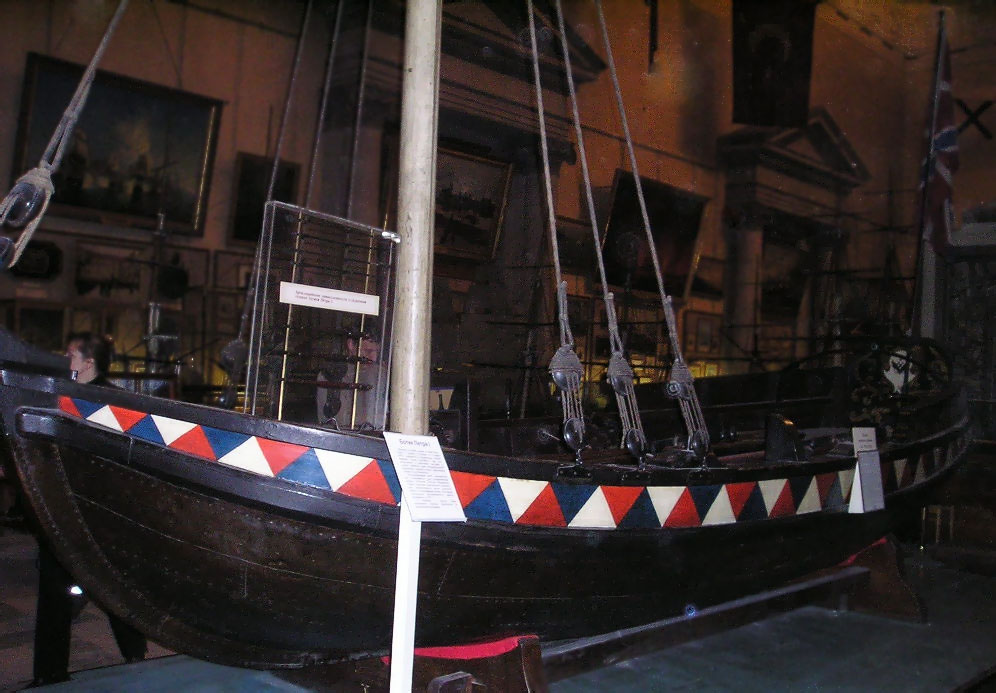
Model of the boat Peter the Great discovered around 1688. Located at the Central Naval Museum, St. Petersburg.

Peter personally studied soldiers and sailors from the bottom up, serving in the rank and file before promoting himself into the officer corps. Thus, Peter did not become a full general until after his victory at Poltava in 1709, and did not become full admiral until the conclusion of the Great Northern War more than a decade later. As early as 1694, he established a dockyard in Archangel and built an entire ship by himself. Russia suffered from an acute lack of expertise, a problem Peter mitigated by going to the foreign quarters in Moscow; there, in a relaxed environment far removed from the throne, he learned the particulars of such things as shipbuilding, navigation, military formation, and the erection of fortifications. Peter wanted to be everywhere at once, and see everything for himself. Not taking his role as tsar very seriously, he and his noble friends often staged elaborate drinking rituals and other forms of horseplay, displays of personal excess that helped unite his circle of friends through talk and drink. However, at the same time, he could be cruel, not flinching from the application of force to put down rebellions and sometimes beating his own friends if he thought it necessary.

Once he took over the governmental machinery, Peter found a distinct lack of skilled specialists with which to run his government. Never placing much importance in rank or origin, Peter began recruiting skilled specialists out of every corner of the Russian empire, including serfs, foreigners, clergymen, and foreign specialists along with the usual boyars. Thus his administration consisted of men from across the social gamut. Most prominent among them was a one Aleksandr Danilovich Menshikov, a childhood friend from Peter's days with the mock troops. Menshikov was a former stableboy of the lowest rank, and would later rise up and become Peter's most able administrator. As corrupt as he was energetic, Menshikov could be found in every part of the Russian governmental machinery, was under constant surveillance by the Russian court, and often met Peter's cudgel, all the while somehow maintaining his prominent position.

With the head of the Russian governance now firmly in place, Peter began a sweeping modernization of his army. Peter inherited a partially Westernized military, and he sought to consolidate the reforms of his predecessors. The army dissolved annually during harvest seasons, and the only regular forces in the Russian army were the streltsy, a formally elite unit that had, by Peter's time, become a hereditary, ill-trained, ill-equipped force that garrisoned in Moscow and played more of a role in politics then in actual fighting.

Peter started by firmly placing the nobility into the officer corps. Drawing on his personal experiences, he made young nobles serve as rank-and-file soldiers before ascending to the officer corps; commoners who distinguished themselves could achieve officer rank as well. Peter believed in lifelong servitude to the state, whether it was growing crops or fighting wars. Thus he offered serfs escape from their lifelong servitude on the farm in return for lifelong servitude in the army. Older and disabled veterans were transferred to positions in administration and the reserves, and thus, once they joined, Peter's troops were bound to the army for life.

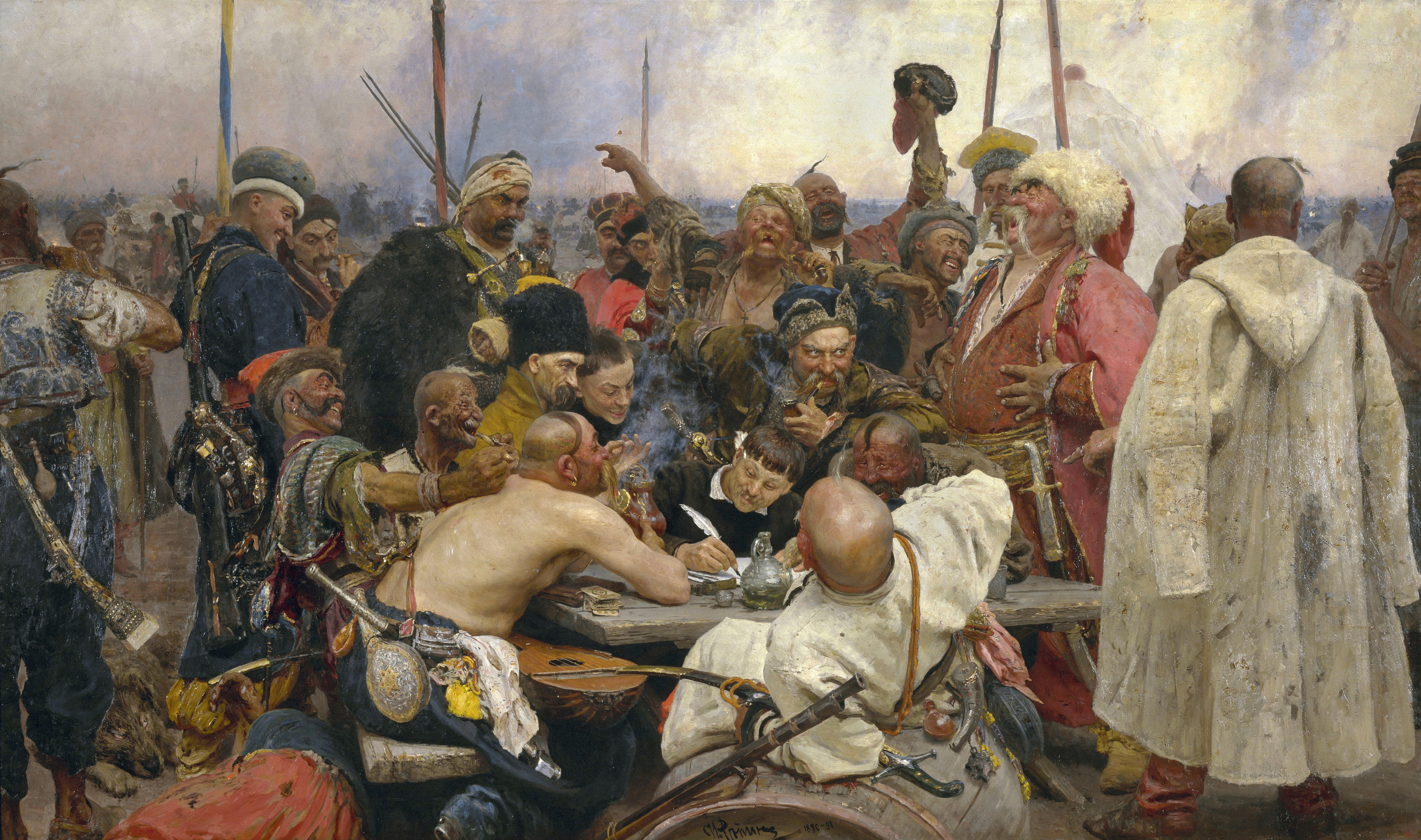
Cossacks were military organizations of the people that occupied the Russian frontier near the Dnieper and the Don. Expert cavalrymen, they were, at different times, both the Russian army's vanguard and its enemy. Peter used them as scouts.

Peter established new schools and training grounds for the officer elite that was to lead the Russian army, and dispatched large numbers of men abroad to learn under foreign masters. Finding promises of release from serfdom insufficient, Peter began drafting soldiers, starting with a levy calling for 1 man for every 50 households. This levy was repeated an incredible 53 times, drawing 300,000 new soldiers into his army. He grew increasingly adept at pulling manpower out of every available resource, including the clergy and enemy deserters. The resultant Russian army was thus heavily Russian; the army was vastly more nationalistic then its European counterparts, which relied heavily on mercenaries.

Peter stressed evolution away from the streltsy and gentry cavalry, although he never discarded it entirely. He introduced a European dress code complete with knee-breeches, tricornes, and long coats. He introduced the flintlock into his army, and his troops were the first to use the bayonet, originally designed for defense, offensively. He also vastly improved and expanded his siege artillery, and later, introduced light artillery. His two elite guard units also functioned as ad hoc police units, having summary powers such as the ability to bring him a transgressive noble or official in chains. What Peter lacked most was specialization; he relied on irregular forces such as Cossacks and nomads for the light cavalry roles of scouting, skirmishing, and raiding, as his proper cavalry were exclusively dragoons, which rode on horseback but dismounted in battle and fought on foot.

=== Siege of Azov, the Grand Embassy, and the Streltsy rebellion ===
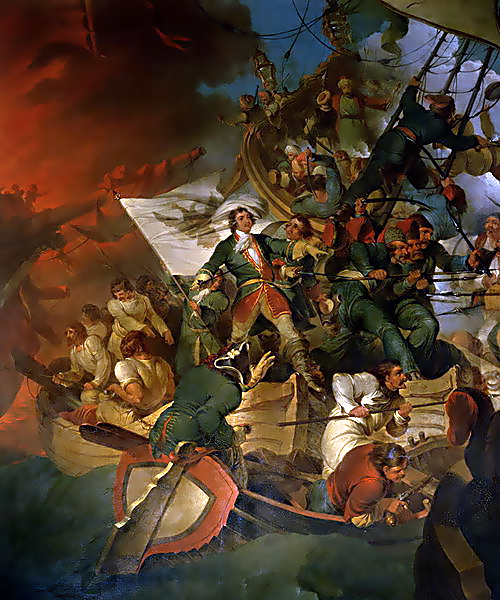
Capture of Azov by Robert Kerr Porter. Peter stands in the foreground, commanding his troops

In 1695, Peter conducted his first major operation with his fledgling military. Having assumed control in 1694, Peter inherited the Holy League's war with Turkey. Under Ottoman power, Turkey controlled the area of the Crimean Tatars at the mouth of the Sea of Azov. The Turks and the Russian had been in on-and-off wars since 1568, vying to control the area around the Black Sea. Previous attempts to take the Crimea directly had failed, so Peter opted to lay siege to Turkish-controlled fortress of Azov at the mouth of the river Don. He envisioned a two-part plan; first, acting as a diversion, a large cavalry force would move towards Turkish forts on the lower Dnieper. Meanwhile, a smaller infantry force moved down the Don river, laying siege to Azov in the summer of 1695. In a characteristic show of bravado Peter the Great arrived as an artilleryman.

Russian forces first had to take a pair of watchtowers guarding heavy chains restricting Russian movements on the water, during which a successful sortie was launched by the Turks that captured many of the Russian siege engines. The Russians accepted the losses and laid down a steady bombardment onto the fort. However, the fort was constantly receiving supplies by water, and the attrition was hurting Peter's forces more than the Turks. After three months, Peter was forced to withdraw.

Although his first attack on Azov proved to be a farce, Peter was tenacious. He understood that the reason he had lost the first battle was Turkish control of the sea, so Peter commissioned the construction of a large fleet at Voronezh on the upper Don. He worked vigilantly himself, using the shipbuilding skills he had learned earlier in his life to great effect. Thus, he was able to launch a fleet of 30 seagoing vessels and over 1,000 transports north of Azov in April 1696. This fleet accompanied a force of 70,000 infantry, twice that which Peter had brought with him during the first siege, and successfully cut off the flow of Turkish supplies. After a month of attrition, a force of 2,000 Cossacks stormed the fort and, although rebuffed, captured part of its outer workings. The Turks, accepting defeat, ceded the fort to the Russians on July 18, 1696.

The events at Azov proved to Peter the value of a sea-borne fleet. Although his predecessors had built primitive fleets on an as-needed basis, the second siege of Azov was their first successful application. Thus, with a need for shipbuilding knowledge and a desire to develop a mighty coalition against the Turks, Peter organized a 250-man expedition for Europe in March 1697. Although Peter traveled incognito as Peter Mikhailov he fooled no one; the six-foot eight tsar was literally heads and shoulders above others, although his disguise spared him having to partake in court formalities. He traveled through Sweden, Austria, the Netherlands, Prussia, England, and the Habsburg Empire, enlisting himself as a workman in many different docks and factories across the continent. For 18 months, Peter ingested everything he could about European craftsmanship, especially navigation, as well as European society in general. His trip was stopped short of a planned passage through Italy by news of a streltsy rebellion at home, and Peter rushed back to Russia in 1698, along with 750 foreigners he had recruited for Russian industry. The hoped-for political gains of the embassy turned out to be dubious at best, but the military gains were enormous.

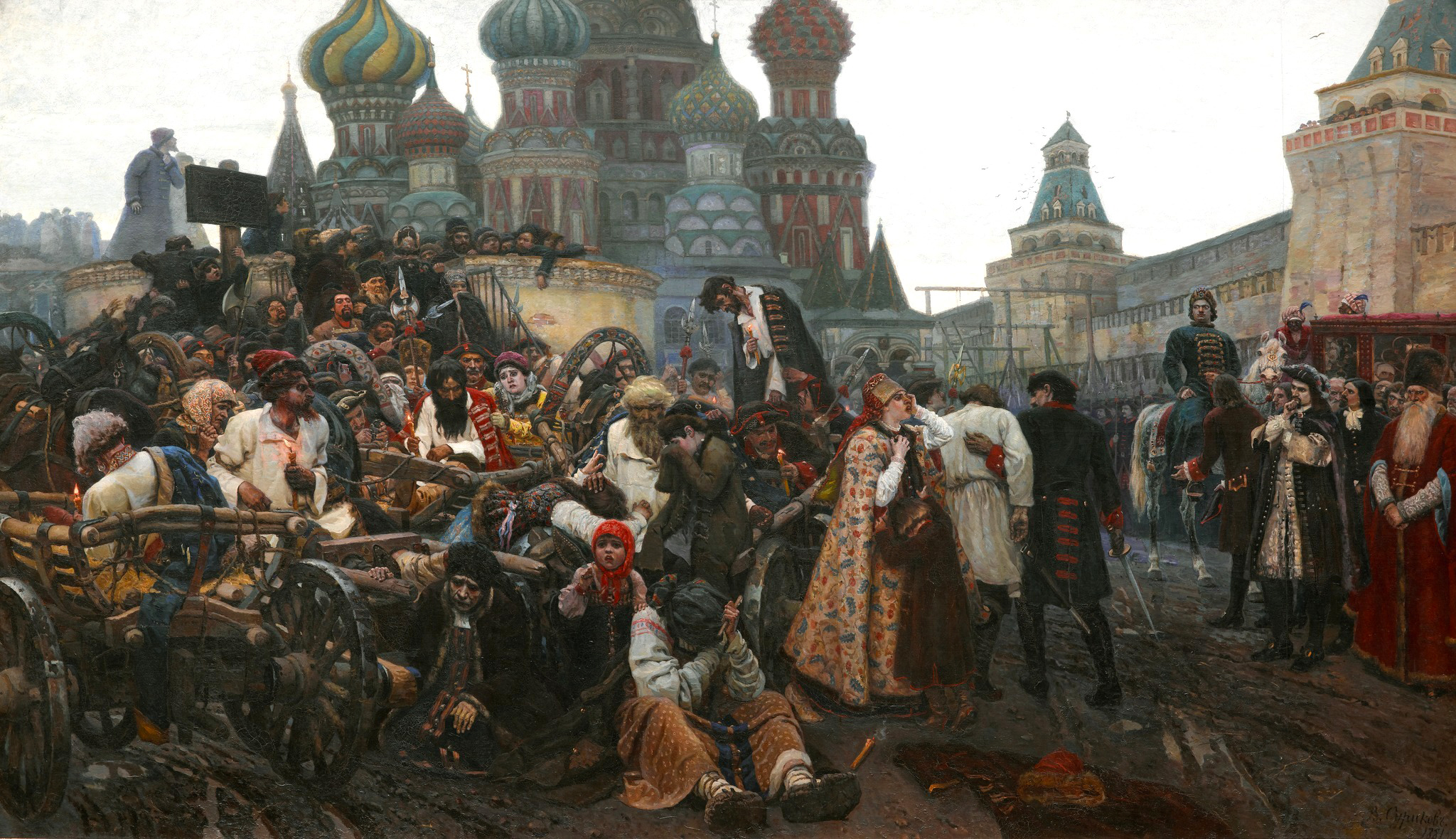
Morning of the execution of the streltsy, by Vasily Surikov

Peter returned to Moscow to find that the rebellion had already been dealt with. He proceeded to interrogate the streltsy, torturing many into revealing that they sympathized with his half-sister and former tsarina Sophia. Thousands of streltsy were executed and hung in public, and Sophia, who had been exiled to a monastery near Moscow, was now forced to become a nun. Peter had the bodies of hundreds of streltsy hung outside her window to remind her of the consequences of confronting him. He also ended his marriage with Eudoxia Lopukhina, who sympathized with the streltsy, and forced her to become a nun as well.

=== Great Northern War ===
Although Peter's "grand coalition" against the Turks had failed to develop, new political developments quickly brought his military attention to the north. 1697 marked the death of Charles XI, king of Sweden. He left his throne to his 15-year-old son, Charles XII. The king's youth and inexperience, coupled with his holdings of several major Baltic ports, made the Swedish empire a tantalizing target for partition by its neighbors. Following the successful Azov campaign, Peter was still negotiating a peace treaty with the Turks, but even so he was negotiating a coalition with Augustus II of Poland and with the Frederick IV of Denmark. Peter began a round of conscription to fill out his ranks in late 1699, and a start date for the war was agreed upon in early 1700. The plan was to have Poland move on southern Livonia and the Danes attack Swedish allies in Schleswig-Holstein. However, Peter's negotiations with the Turks took him longer than he expected, and so in January 1700 Augustus II declared war on Sweden, followed within a few months by the Danes, with Russia standing on the sidelines. It was not until July of that year that the Treaty of Constantinople was finally signed, preserving Peter's gains in Turkey, and freeing him to make war with Sweden.

==== Initial losses and the Battle of Narva ====
By the time Peter became involved, the coalition was already falling apart. Charles XII proved to be an unprecedented military genius and far superior a commander then his foes had expected. With utmost daring, in July 1700 Charles crossed the straits to Denmark with 15,000 men, carrying the fighting into the heart of their territory; the Danes, utterly defeated, surrendered within a month. Unaware of this, Peter declared war on Sweden in August 1700. Peter led an army of 35,000 men, and quickly laid siege to the city of Narva on the banks of the Narva River, just south of the Gulf of Finland. Peter organized the siege works, but left soon after to organize reinforcements for Charles's eventual relief effort (and thus, as it would turn out, taking himself out of harm's way). Choosing between Poland and Russia, Charles XII thought Russia to be the more dangerous threat, and led a small army of around 11,000 men into the besieged city in November.

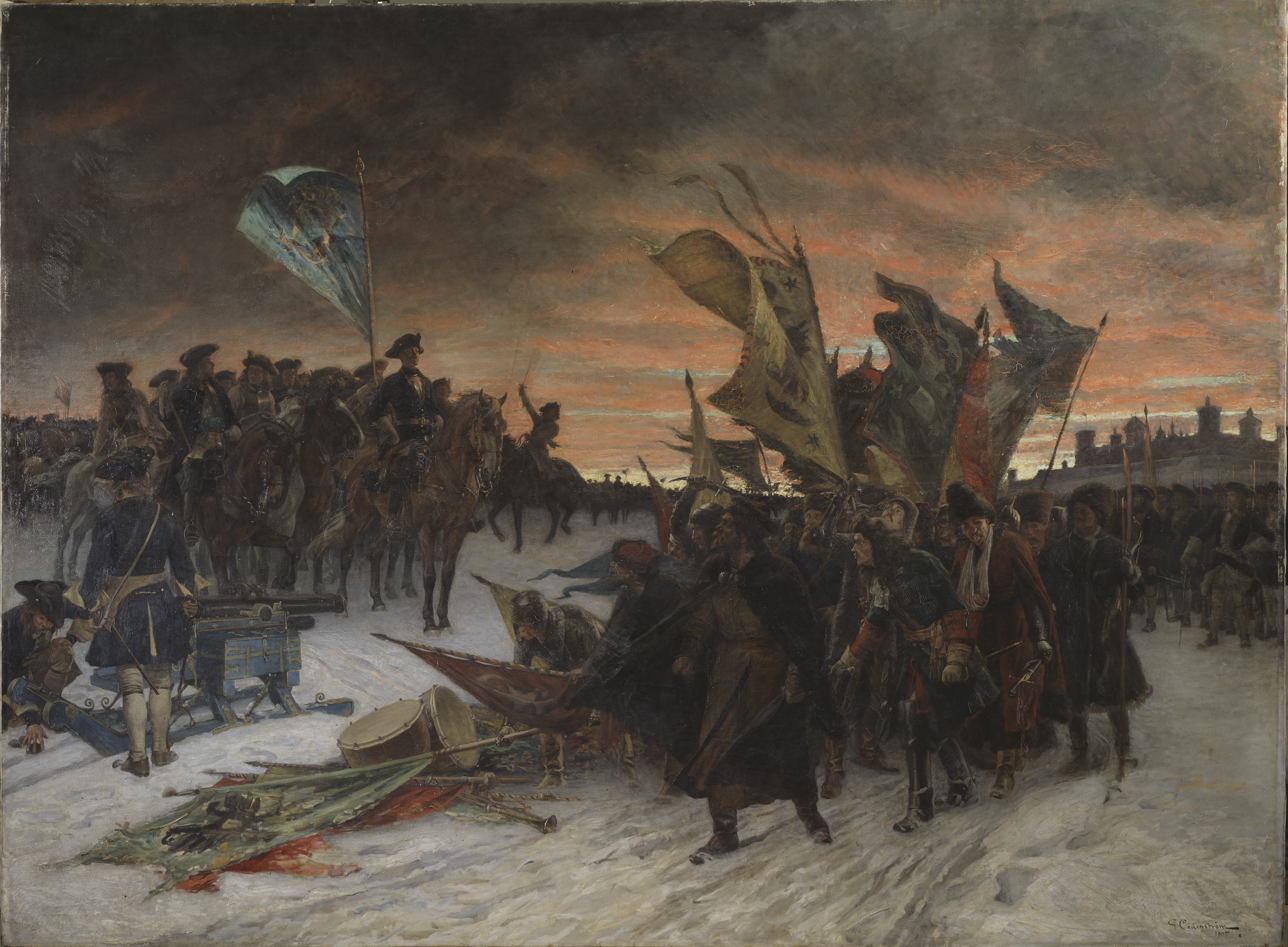
Victory at Narva by Gustaf Cederström

The Russians, enjoying a 3 to 1 numerical advantage, expected Charles XII to wait for reinforcements before attacking; but in another daring move, the Swedish forces, under cover of a blizzard, opted instead for a surprise attack on the Russian line. Caught off-guard, thinly stretched, and vulnerable to penetration by the skilled Swedish army, the ensuing battle quickly turned into a rout, with the panicked Russian troops attempting to swim over the frigid Narva River, many drowning in its freezing waters. The remainder of the Russian troops were mopped up with ease; only three groups, Peter's elite troops and one light infantry brigade, actually put up a reasonable fighting retreat, using supply wagons as improvised defenses. The Battle of Narva, as it came to be called, was a crushing defeat for Peter's young army, with the vast majority of the Russian forces destroyed and nearly all of its siege equipment captured. The Swedes suffered only 700 casualties, while more than 6,000 Russian troops were killed and another 20,000 captured.

==== Rebuilding his army, the Livonian campaign, and Polish defeat ====
Following the battle, with the Russian army broken, Charles XII reasoned that the Russians were no longer a threat to him and turned south to deal with Poland instead of pursuing Russia. Historians still argue as to whether or not Charles should have pressed his pursuit of the broken Russian enemy; had he chosen to pursue Peter, he might vary well have forced a quick victory and changed the outcome of the war. Regardless, after breaking a Saxony siege on Riga in the summer of 1701, Charles crossed into the Polish–Lithuanian Commonwealth. Although the Polish resisted for 6 years, they were finally forced out of the war following Swedish victory, again at impossible odds, at the Battle of Fraustadt. Augustus II was forced off the throne and replaced with the less aggressive Stanisław Leszczyński, and Poland ended its alliance with Russia.

The six year respite proved critical for Peter the Great. With characteristic energy, he quickly rebuilt his army. New officers were pulled out of the nobility in Russia and hired from abroad, and the replacement of soldiers lost at Narva was accomplished through heavy-handed conscription. Peter scraped money to finance his new campaign out of every hole he could find, raising taxes, creating new ones, monopolizing the salt trade, and debasing the currency, anything he could do to raise more cash. Most notoriously, he introduced a tax on beards, and forced churches to melt their bells to make cannons. As new soldiers needed new weapons, much of the money went into the Russian metalworking industry, vastly improving the quantity and quality of the industry, and through it the quality of the Russian weaponry. Because of the large distances involved in the northern war, Peter also built up a large contingent of cavalry.

Peter tempered this new army in attacks on the Swedish holdings of Livonia and Ingria on the Baltic shore. Once he was sure that Charles was heading south, he ordered his field marshal, Boris Sheremetev, to attack the lightly defended colonies, whilst also sending a division south, to delay Charles XII and give Peter time to finish mending his forces. At the end of 1701, Sheremetev met a vastly outnumbered Swedish force on the field at Erastfer in Livonia, soundly defeating them; he repeated the feat again at Hummelshof in July 1702. These two victories, the first significant ones in the Russian campaign, helped boost Russian morale after the catastrophe at Narva. Peter then sent Sheremetev to Ingria, where he mopped up Swedish forces on the Lake Ladoga isthmus. October 1702 marked the taking of the Swedish fort of Nöteborg. In May 1703, Peter captured Nyenschantz fortress. He chose a spot at the mouth of the Neva, surrounded by marshes, to establish his fortress of Saint Petersburg. Originally an outpost against the Swedes and Peter's "window to the west", the fortress would later grow into one of Russia's largest and most important population centers, and under Peter, Russia's capital.

Sheremetev's success continued into 1704. The major inland city of Dorpat fell in July 1704, its walls breached by Peter's new artillery. This artillery then went on to play a pivotal role in the second Battle of Narva. This time, with heavier numbers, and Charles XII far away in Poland, Peter was able to take the city, albeit with heavy casualties. The commander in the city violated the ideal of an honorable surrender by refused to give in, and once the Russians breached the city, the remaining Swedish forces were massacred. Overall, the many Swedish losses on the home front put a large dent in the Swedish economy, already strained by the effects of the war. Peter also rapidly assembled a new fleet in the Baltic, resembling his southern one & around that time in 1705 officially formed Russia's first marine unit.

Charles XII elected his own candidate to the Polish throne in 1704, and spent the next three years chasing down Augustus II, now fleeing west towards his native Saxony. Charles XII met Peter's main army, dug in at Grodno, in early 1706. Unwilling to meet an elite force on foreign territory, Peter ordered his forces to retreat, but kept light forces in the area to harass the Swedes whenever possible. Part of the retreating column, led by Menshikov, met a smaller Swedish detachment at Kalisz, and in the ensuing battle defeated it soundly. However, by 1707, Charles had finally chased down and deposed King Augustus, ending his Polish detour and bringing his attention squarely back to Russia.

==== Domestic revolts and the Ukrainian detour ====
With only 50,000 soldiers, Charles XII could not dream of conquering all of Russia. Instead, he reasoned that the great wartime pressure that Peter had placed on his country, coupled with the discontent of the boyar nobility, would hand him the victory he desired. Charles had a strong base for this decision, for Peter's heavy-handed taxation had raised discontent against the crown. In the summer of 1705, an unknown monk and a member of the streltsy started a rebellion in Astrakhan against what they saw as the destructive influence of the nobility and foreign influence. The rebellion was bloodily suppressed in March 1707. Similarly, 1705 also marked the rebellion of the Turkish Bashkirs, for parallel reasons; this rebellion was not put down until 1711.

More serious was the Bulavin Rebellion in 1707. Opposed to the government position regarding fugitives and influenced by anti foreignism, Konrad Bulavin, a leader of the Don Cossacks, started a rebellion. This was not the first uprising in the enstrangled relations between Russia and the Cossacks, but it followed the same pattern; the rebellion spread across the south widely, and at its climax may have involved as many as 100,000 men, but was ill-organized and badly led. The rebellion was systematically suppressed by Russian troops pulled off the front; dissension spread among Bulavin's men, and he committed suicide in July 1708. The remainder of the rebellion was mopped up by 1709.

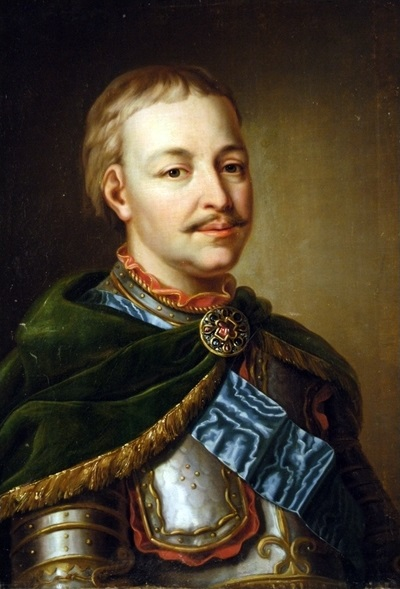
Hetman Ivan Mazepa's defection to the Swedes, which partially justified Charles XII's movement south, would have wide-ranging consequences for the remainder of the war.

Regardless, by the summer of 1708, Charles was positioned in Lithuania, facing a road directly towards Moscow. However, he faced a desolate tundra, deliberately laid bare by Russian forces and protected by the significant fortress of Smolensk. His troops were constantly being harassed by Russian light troops, and reinforcements were still en route. Diplomatically, although Peter offered deals that would return all of the land he captured, save Saint Peterburg and Neva, Charles would not settle for anything less than Swedish victory. Ukraine, fertile and as yet untouched by the war, lay to the south; he also knew that Cossack hetman Ivan Mazepa, who largely controlled Ukraine under Peter, was secretly scheming against his tsar. Thus, the Swedes turned south, and entered Ukraine instead.

Historians still argue over whether or not a direct attack could have succeeded, but the Ukrainian diversion turned out to be a disaster for Charles. Charles's long baggage train out of Riga, along with 12,000 reinforcements, were caught by fast-moving Russian cavalry in the fall of 1708. They harassed the reinforcements and supplies, and in the ensuing Battle of Lesnaya Peter's dragoons fought the Swedes to a standstill. Facing increasing Russian numbers, the Swedes were forced to burn their supplies, bury their cannons, and make a rush for Charles's main army; out of 12,000 men, only 6,000, and virtually none of the supplies, actually made it to Charles. With more men and no supplies, this only compounded Charles's food problems. The thought-of Cossack reinforcements proved to be illusory as well; although Mazepa defected to the Swedes, he only brought 3,000 troops with him. As retribution, Menshikov sacked and razed Baturyn, slaughtering upwards of 6,000 men, women, and children and completely destroying Mazepa's capital. No one else dared defect, and Ukraine remained firmly under Peter's control.

==== Battle of Poltava ====
Charles was running out of both time and options. Winter 1708–09 was a miserable one for the Swedes encamped in Ukraine, and in the following spring Charles was bogged down in a siege of the small Russian fortress of Poltava. Peter, still wary of engaging the Swedes in a pitched battle, slowly moved his troops through fortified positions to relieve the small fort. Charles foresaw that he could not take Poltava in time to avoid the Russians, but was confident that his 25,000 veteran troops, despite dwindling numbers, lack of supplies, and exhaustion, could defeat the 40,000 Russians in battle and finally end the war with Swedish victory. Peter, meanwhile, could afford to be patient; the Swedes were marooned far from support or reinforcements, and were losing numbers every day. The most direct path between the Russian camp to the north and Poltava was through treacherous forest and marsh, and thus Peter foresaw that any Swedish attack would double around the left, heading west before turning north through open ground towards the Russian army. Peter built six earthen redoubts in a line facing this probable Swedish charge, later augmenting them with four more, extending south in a "T".

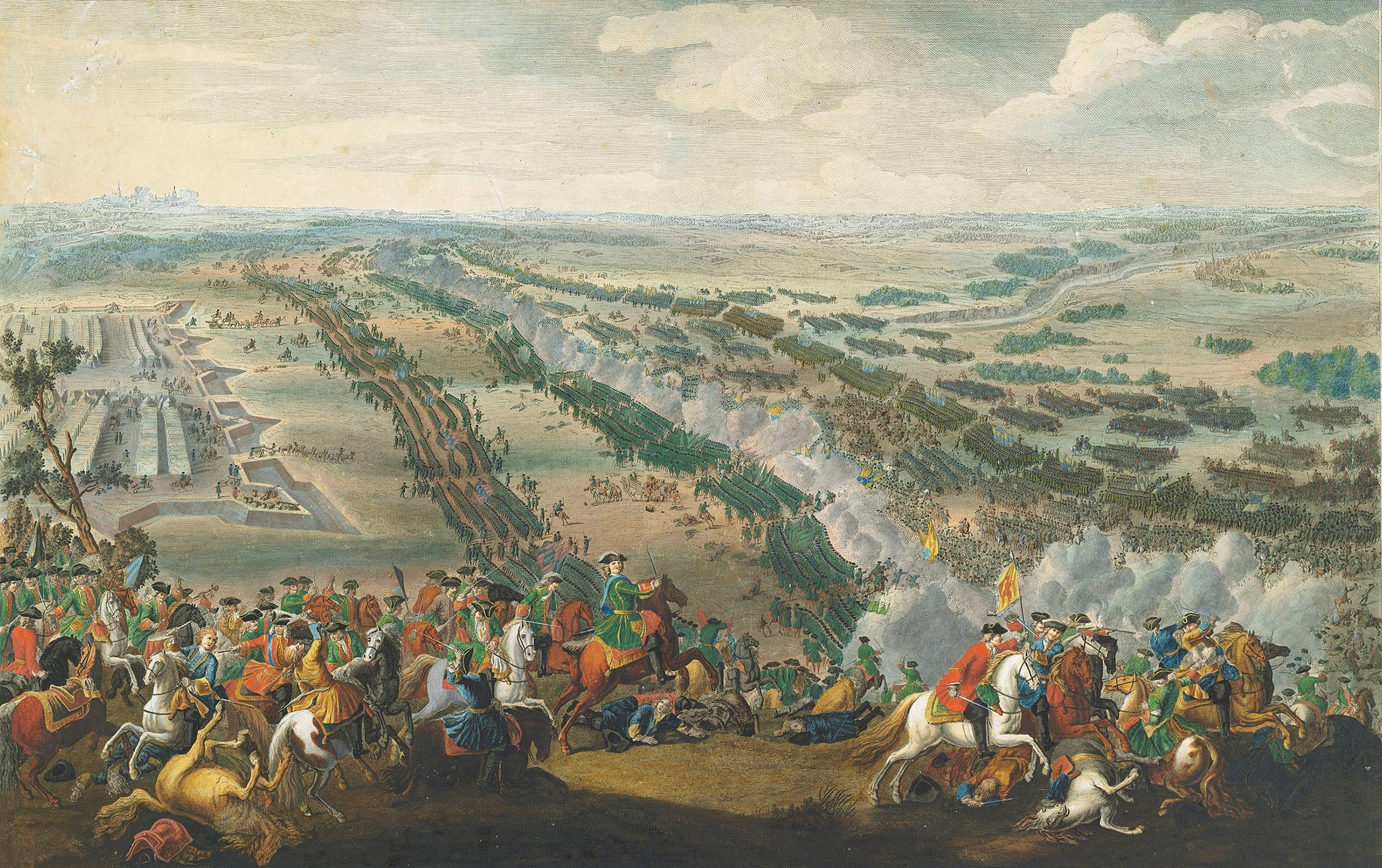
Pierre-Denis Martin, Battle of Poltava

In late June, while preparing for the attack, Charles XII was shot in the foot. Thus, once the charge was made on the morning of 8 July 1709 (N. S.), he was leading the battle off of a litter. To Peter's satisfaction, the Swedes moved in exactly the way that he had anticipated. Charles was well aware of the redoubts that Peter had dug, and had reasoned that, to avoid being bogged down and losing the element of surprise, he would rush past them as quickly as he could, and accept the resulting losses, even leaving the bulk of his artillery behind to speed his movement. However, Charles was not aware of the additional four pieces of earthwork that Peter had dug on the eve of battle; to surmount this new problem, Charles spent valuable time rearranging his troops from firing lines, superb for volley fire, to faster-moving but less fire-ready columns, a time-consuming move that lost him the element of surprise he had hoped for earlier. With Peter now aware of Charles's movements, the plan quickly went awry; many of the Swedish forces got caught up fighting the redoubts anyway, and the smoke from fire on both sides, and the din from the engagements between the Russian and Swedish cavalry ahead of the main force, prevented him from effectively organizing his army. Charles pulled his forces west to reorganize back into a firing line, in a low wooded area to side of the main Russian camp.

Meanwhile, Peter prepared as well, moving his cavalry north to move on the Swedish left flank and also arranging his troops into a line. Charles took on the burden of attack, once again counting on the steadiness and experience of his troops to break the Russian lines. The Swedish right wing led the ensuing attack; as in earlier battles, the veteran troops outfought the Russians, collapsing them back and seizing supporting cannon as well. However, the weight of massed Russian fire opened a hole in the middle of the Swedish line, and the Russians, now fully able to make full use of such an event, poured through it and broke the Swedish column in half. The Swedish line broke and scattered, and 10,000 Swedes were killed or captured; most of the rest were captured on the banks of the Dnieper by Menshikov. Only a few hundred, including Charles himself, escaped south to Turkish exile.

The Battle of Poltava was one of the most decisive victory in Russian history. The result of the Battle of Poltava, and of the following surrender, was that the bulk of the Swedish army was simply annihilated, leaving Sweden wide open for attack. At home, the victory gave Peter the political capital, and the war lull, he needed to crush ongoing domestic issues; in fact, if Peter had lost the battle, opposition to the tsar's reforms could have become active support for a new tsar. Poltava demonstrates how far the Russian army had come; after all, just nine years earlier, the Russians had been almost destroyed fighting the Swedes with an even greater numerical advantage. Peter the Great fully appreciated the importance of the battle's outcome, and made sure to thank the captured Swedes for their "lessons". However, the battle did not win the war, which was not yet even half over.

==== Ottoman detour ====
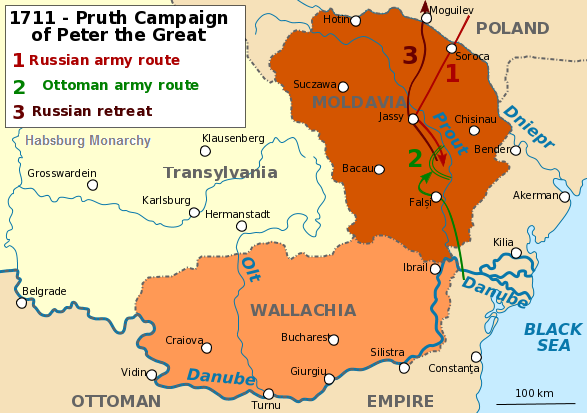
Overview of the 1711 Pruth campaign

The Ottomans had been apprehensive of Peter's militaristic gains, but had stayed out of the war. However, edged on by France and by Charles XII, the Ottomans, at the time harboring an exiled Charles XII, declared war on Peter by 1710. Now enjoying a temporary lull in the Great Northern War thanks to Poltava, Peter was quick, indeed eager, to move south. He pulled many of his troops, as well as Sheremetev, his most reliable general, south across the whole length of Russia to fight this new war. This was not the first time that Russia had fought against the Ottomans, and it would not be the last; however, like in earlier wars, Peter underestimated the distances involved and the stress of having to fight two wars simultaneously. Peter was the first to actively encourage Wallachia and Moldavia, mostly Christian areas under Turkish control, to revolt against their Ottoman rulers.

By spring 1711 Peter was ready. He moved his army from Kyiv down through Poland, skirting wide of the Black Sea, before crossing the Dnester into Moldavia, aiming to sever it from Turkish rule. In reality, the campaign turned out to be a disaster; the 40,000 Russian troops, stymied by the enormous distances involved, were instead trapped on the river Prut by 130,000 Turkish troops. In the only major battle, the Russians successfully held the Ottomans, unaccustomed to concentrated Russian firepower, at bay, but the fight was indeed hopeless, as Peter was trapped and facing a superior Turkish force. The resultant treaty was surprisingly lenient considering that the Russian force was facing annihilation; Peter lost Azov, was forced to abandon his southern fleet, promised not to meddle with Polish affairs, and guaranteed safe passage to Sweden for Charles XII. In return, Peter was able to extricate himself from the situation, and continued to hold a dominant position in the Great Northern War.

==== Final Swedish defeat and aftermath ====
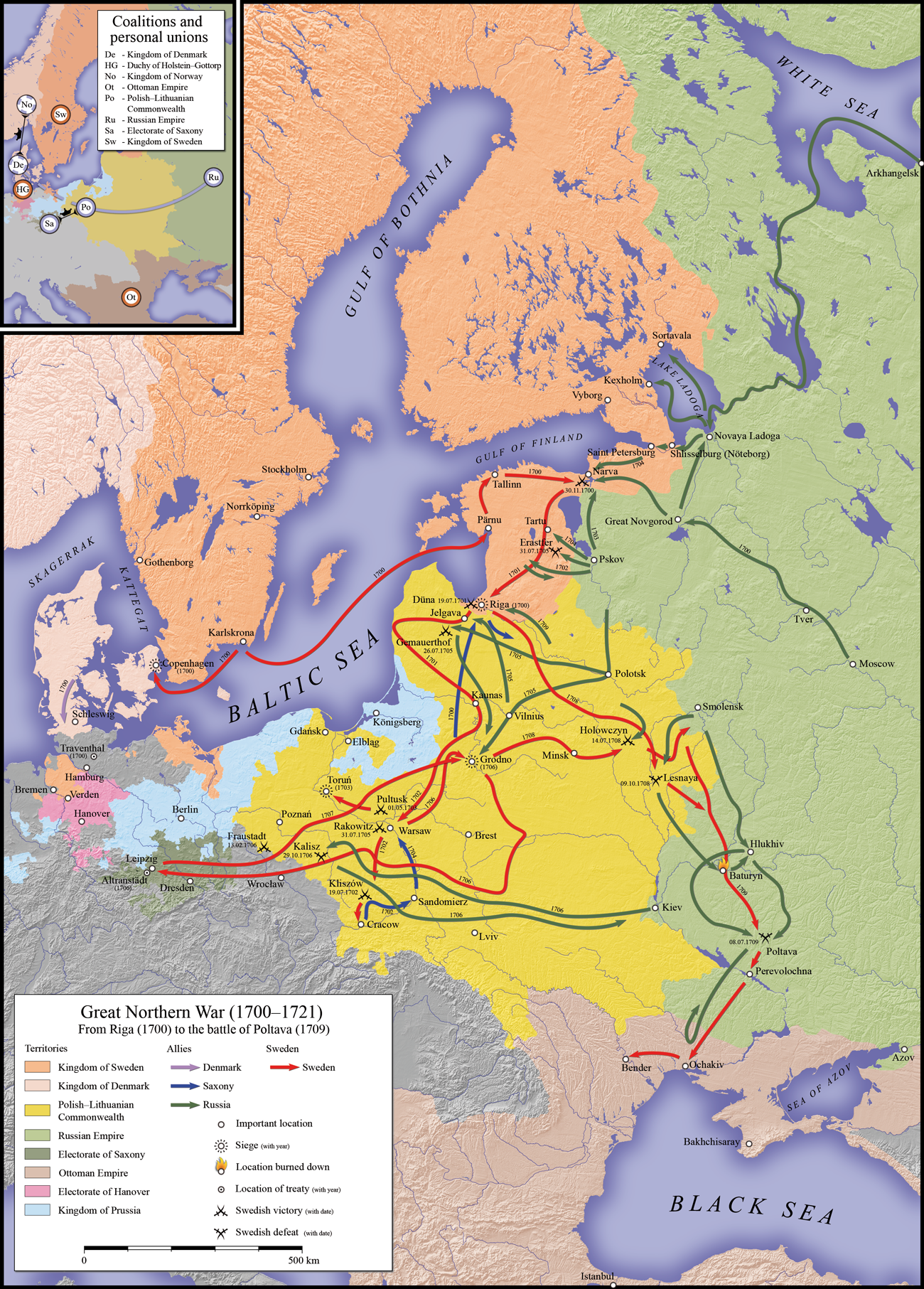
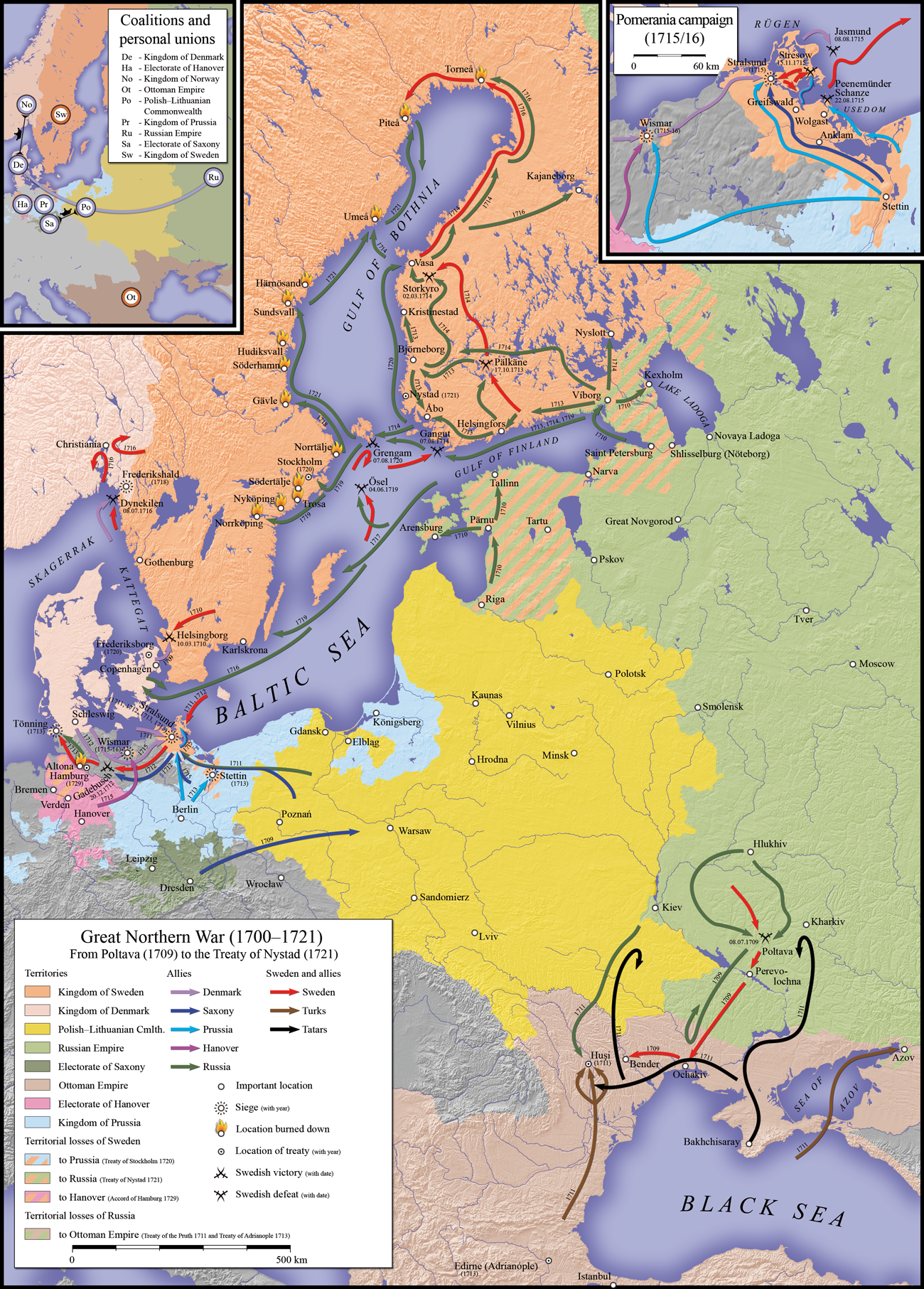
Campaigns and territorial changes 1700–1709 (left) and 1709–1721 (right)

With the issue with the Ottomans now settled, Peter turned his attention back to the north, and to the dismantling of the Swedish Empire on the Baltic. He seized Viborg, Riga, and Reval in 1710. With Charles XII now deposed, the coalition against Sweden was formed again. Peter divided his army between assisting his allies in the south Baltic, and his own attacks in the east. What is now Estonia and Livonia, weakly defended, fell quickly. Peter then moved north and invaded Finland in 1713. Meanwhile, Charles, traveling incognito, returned to Sweden in 1714. The Swedes, with their empire broken and nothing left to lose, continued to fight. At sea, the prebuilt Russian fleet, which had proved useless when victory was still uncertain, was proving its worth at consolidating Russian victories; victories at Gangut in 1714, Ösel in 1719, and Grengam in 1720 gave Peter control of the sea.

Even while he was dismantling the Swedish Empire, Peter continued to reform and refine his army. Russia's administration system at the time, the prikazy, was an antiquated, jumbled form of governance, with overlapping jurisdictions and lacking separation of powers. In 1717 he began replacing these instead with collegias, or "colleges", based on the Swedish model. As a rule Peter employed equal parts native Russians and foreign servitors. Unlike the prikazy they replaced, colleges could not make a decision without a consensus of their members, so-called "governance by board" that helped stifle wayward decisions as well as corruption. Among the first two colleges created were the College of War, which controlled the army and was led by Menshikov, and the Admiralty Board, which controlled the navy and was led by admiral Fyodor Apraksin.

The sudden rise of Russia to power, and its protracted success in the war, triggered waves of concern across Europe. To help quell these waves, Peter traveled to Paris in 1717. Although his trip was inconclusive—France only promised to avoid involvement—once again, it gave Peter an opportunity to study Western Europe. In late 1718, Charles XII himself was shot through the head in a minor battle, possibly by his own soldiers. A broken Sweden sought allies against the Russian juggernaut, but the search proved fruitless, and with Russian troops regularly crossing the Baltic and raiding mainland Sweden, even reaching the suburbs of Stockholm, the Swedes finally admitted ultimate defeat.

In the resultant Treaty of Nystad, Peter was extremely lenient with the Swedes, keeping Estonia, Livonia, Ingria, and part of southern Finland (especially Saint Petersburg) in exchange for the return of most of Finland to the Swedes and the payment of 2 million silver riksdaler. Peter could afford to be lenient, as the war was a decisive shift in the European balance of power. The Swedish Empire was carved up, and its position as a great power was taken by Russia. Celebrating these victories, Peter took the title of imperator, and the Russian Empire was thus founded. The Northern War left Russia as the dominant power in Northern Europe, and gave it firm control over the Baltic and thus a "window to the west". The war had also bettered Russia's position with respect to its Polish rival, which came to a head much later under Catherine the Great with the First Partition of Poland. Finally, it put Russia into direct contact with another of the great powers of Europe, Germany. Peter himself emerged a national hero; scripts at the time compared him to Hercules, Samson, and David.

=== Iranian campaign and final military reforms ===
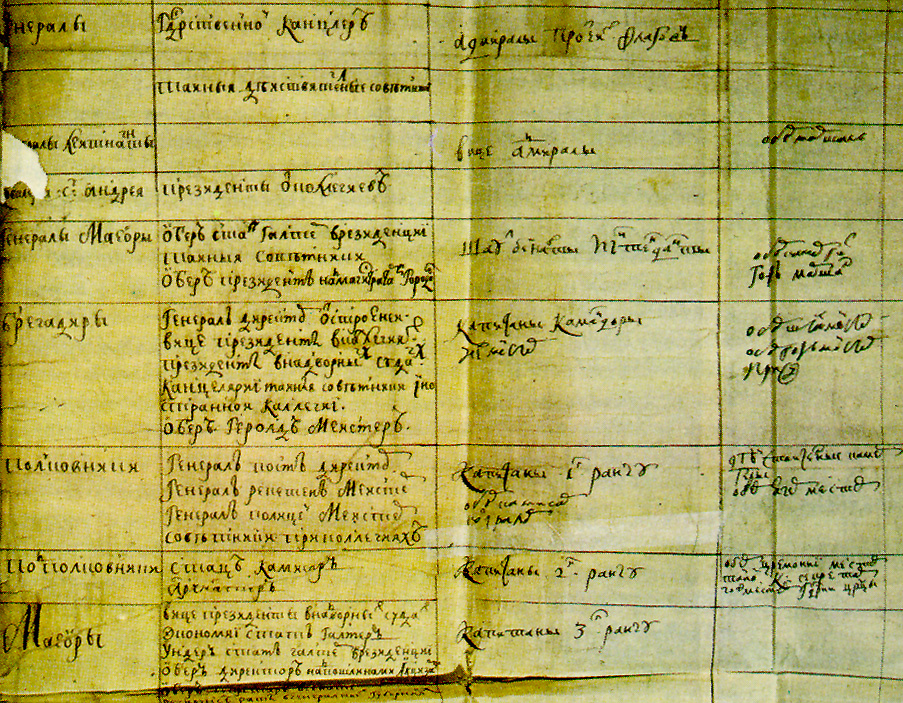
The Table of Ranks

The marathon Great Northern War was not the last war during Peter's tsardom, which saw one last short war in the south. In 1722, Peter allied with Georgia and Armenia, looking to seize land at the expense of the declining Safavid Iran and deny it to the Ottomans. Upon declaring war, Peter ordered the construction of the Caspian Flotilla and sailed down the Volga to command a joint land-sea campaign that took the city of Derbent, before being forced to return to Astrakhan for supplies. The Russian forces fought on, facing little resistance, without Peter's involvement, taking Resht late that year and Baku the next before Iran finally sued for peace.

In November 1719, the Treaty of Stockholm was made between Sweden and Hanover. Sweden handed over Bremen and Verden to Holstein in return for financial and naval support. The Elector of Hanover was George I. Later, in January and February 1720, another Treaty of Stockholm was signed between Sweden and Brandenburg. Sweden ceded Stettin, South Pomerania, the islands of Usedom and Wollin in return for money. Before the end of the Great Northern War, the Treaty of Fredriksborg was signed between Sweden and Denmark for Sweden to give up her exception from paying taxes to use the military service, the Sound. She also gave up Holstein-Gottorp. Finally, proceeding the War, in August and September 1721, the Treaty of Nyastad was signed between Sweden and Russia. Sweden ceded Livonia, Estonia and Ingria while Russia returned Finland, excluding Kexholm and parts of Karelia.

Domestically, Peter contributed one last major element to Russia before his death in 1725: his Table of Ranks. Introduced in 1722, the Table organized the four major governmental branches, the army, navy, civil service, and court, into 14 major ranks. This standardized government positions and allowed officers to accurately gauge their relative importance; there was no table for common men. The Table was Peter's way of handling the appointment of nobility, as well as organizing Russian military positions; Peter had not appointed any new boyars, and the old honor code of mestnichestvo, which placed more stress on hereditary origins then on actual skill, had been rightfully abolished in 1682. He had resorted to the ad-hoc appointment before, but by the time of the Great Northern War this was quickly proving tedious, necessitating the change. Those that reached a certain level on the table were granted personal nobility, and for those that reached rank 12 or 8, depending on the service, hereditary nobility was granted, thus both rewarding merit and satisfying Peter's nobility. The Table, with minor changes, continued to find use until it was finally abolished in 1917.

== Catherine I and Peter II ==
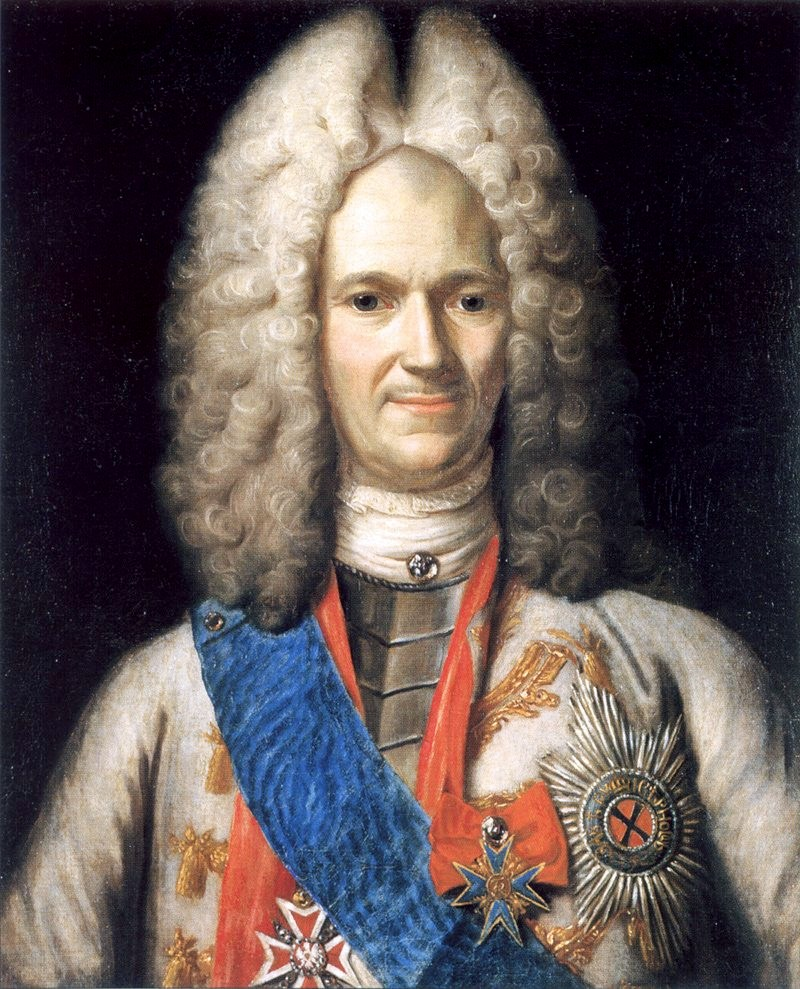
Aleksandr Danilovich Menshikov, one of Peter's greatest friends and closest advisors. After Peter's death in 1725, he closely associated himself with Catherine I, and was the de facto ruler of Russia for 2 years during the reign of Peter II. A series of coups afterwards eventually saw him in exile in Siberia.

Peter's death left no clear candidate for succession to the throne. His son, Aleksei, was a shy, bookish man with little interest in the throne, as well as a constant target for revolts aimed at undermining Peter's rule. Alexei had renounced his interest in the throne in 1714, an action that made Peter furious; Aleksei was captured and tortured, and died of his injuries in 1718. None of Peter's other male children survived into adulthood. In addition, in 1722 he had declared that the naming of an heir was the tsar's choice, not a matter of genealogy.

Peter had crowned his second wife, Catherine, empress of Russia in 1724, strengthening her claim to the throne and making her a leading candidate, alongside Peter's grandson Peter Alekseyevich. Peter, a child at the time, was backed by the old nobility, while Catherine found support in the newer class, especially Menshikov. The Preobrazhensky and Semenovsky guard regiments, which had associated with Catherine during her trips alongside her husband during his later military campaigns, decided the issue by demonstrating in Catherine's support. The opposition collapsed, and Catherine I was named the new tsar. The two palace guard regiments would decide many such political issues in the future, resembling the old streltsy in this regard. Catherine left most of the work of ruling to her close adviser Menshikov. Her most important contribution was the formation of the Supreme Privy Council, a small group of advisers to the tsar (of which Menshikov was a part), and her development of the two royal guard regiments.

Catherine did not rule long, and died in 1727. Although she had two surviving daughters, Menshikov engineered the crowning of Peter's grandson, Peter II, as the new tsar. Peter II was not yet 12 years old, and Menshikov aggressively maneuvered to strengthen his position; he married Peter to his own daughter, brought him into his own household, and began to methodically weaken his opponents in the Privy Council. In the end, Menshikov overreached; his bold grabs at power alarmed the Russian nobility, and Peter, increasingly disliking Menshikov, allied himself with Prince Ivan Dolgorukov instead. Menshikov was exiled to Siberia, where he died in 1729. Peter II himself died in 1730, succumbing to smallpox, again leaving no heir.

The short reigns of both Catherine and Peter II were marked by the slow degradation of the Russian army and navy. Peter's draconian taxes were reduced, military units disbanded, and the navy was left to rot at anchor. The army would again be strengthened for various small actions in the 1730s and 1740s, but the declining trend of the Russian navy was not reversed for centuries.

== Anna I ==
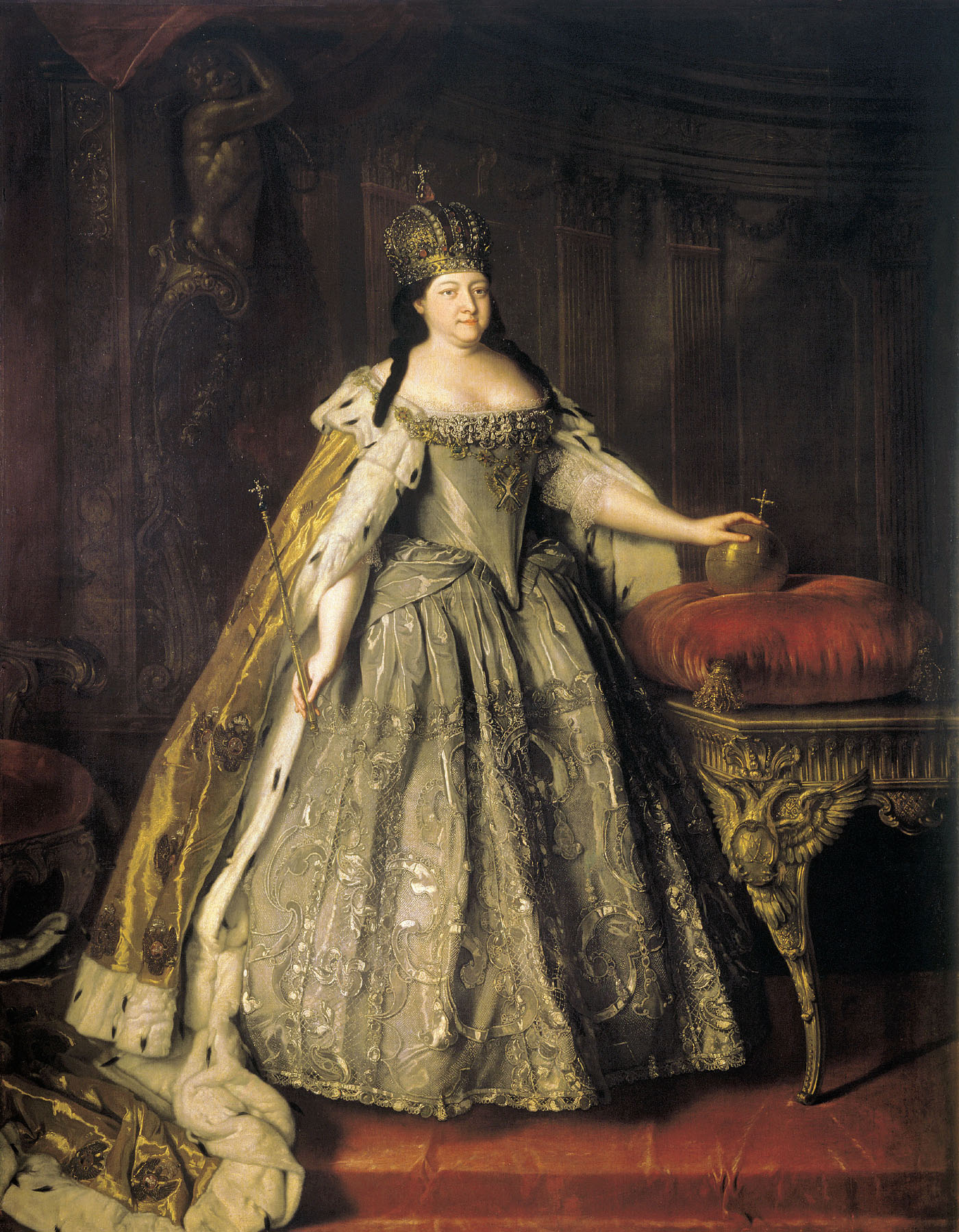
Anna I ruled Russia from 1730 to 1740. Her heavily German administration was deeply unpopular with the Russian populace.

The next leading candidate to the throne, as chosen by the Privy Council, was Anna Ivanovna, who was the daughter of Peter's late brother Ivan V. The primary reason for their choice was her political weakness as a woman and widow, something that the Council moved aggressively to take advantage of; they declared that they would approve her crowning only if she gave up the power to make and amend taxes, declare war, control the army, grant and revoke estates, and appoint people to high positions in the government. In short, the Privy Council was aiming to gut the power of the tsar and make the Russian Empire a de facto oligarchy. However, the plan did not come to fruition; the Russian nobility was terrified by the prospects of such a shift in power, as were the palace guard regiments, and with their collective force Anna was able to tear up the restrictions placed on her and dissolve the Council for good.

Anna had few friends in the Russian government due to her time in Courland, and intense distrust towards the Russian nobility that had tried to slight her once already. Therefore, she staffed her rule mostly with foreigners, especially Baltic Germans, led by her deeply unpopular favorite Ernst Johann von Biron. She often elected favorites to important positions, regardless of their actual experience, and thus corruption ran rampart as many tried to accumulate personal wealth and influence. Nonetheless, the foreign office, under Andrey Osterman, and the army, under Burkhard Christoph von Münnich, benefited greatly from foreign influence; it serves to note that both men had previously served under Peter the Great. The palace guards had helped her ascend to the throne, but all the same, Anna created a third Izmaylovsky regiment to balance out their power.

=== Münnich's reforms ===
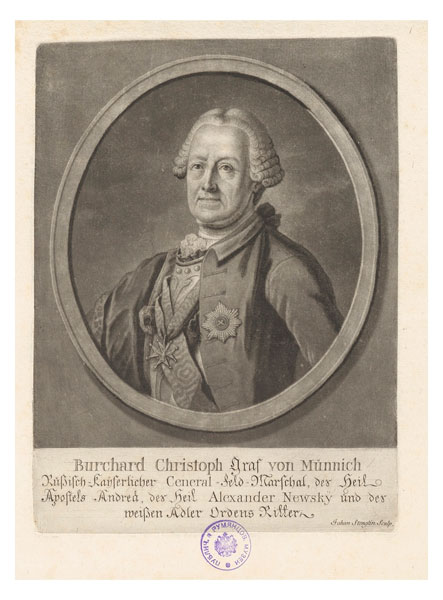
Burkhard Christoph von Münnich, a leading military reformer and Anna I's military aide. He stressed militaristic efficiency and flexibility, and introduced Russia's first heavy cavalry units. (Engraving by Johann Stenglin)

Münnich, a tireless and power-hungry figure, had accumulated experience fighting in the War of the Spanish Succession before traveling to Russia and fighting during Peter's campaigns as an engineer. As a German delegate independent from the Russian nobility, he appealed to Anna, an appeal that Münnich used to ascend to presidency of the War College in 1732. Münnich worked to develop a smaller, stronger military. He disbanded superfluous units and introduced numerous improvements in financial management, whilst continuing the status quo of letting the navy rot at anchor. He established Cadet Corps to train young nobles for military service, effectively replacing Peter's requirement that they serve in the ranks first, as well as reducing the military service requirement to 25 years—still a draconian demand, but considerably better than Peter's theoretically lifelong model.

Münnich also worked towards making the Russian army more flexible and efficient. He increased the number of artillery pieces per infantry units, and redistributed grenadiers among them to increase their effectiveness. Münnich also introduced important changes in Russian cavalry. Prior to Münnich, most Russian cavalry had been dragoons, moving on cavalry but fighting on foot. Peter also had cossacks, which filled out the traditional light cavalry roles of raiding, harassing, monitoring, and scouting out enemy troops. Münnich introduced regiments of hussars (light cavalry staffed mostly by Eastern European foreigners) to complement the irregular Cossacks with regular troops. More acute was the distinct lack of heavy cavalry regiments to perform shock attacks; Münnich introduced three elite guard cavalry regiments (peers to the three guard infantry regiments) and several regiments of heavy cuirassiers (named for the heavy breastplate or cuirass they wore) to fill out this role. These new regiments rode the heaviest horses in Russia at the time.

=== War of Polish Succession ===
The first test of the Russian military strength in the post-Peter era, although not a very difficult one, was the War of the Polish Succession in 1733–1734. Following the death of Peter's old ally Augustus II of Poland, an election to throne a new king. Russia had expected Augustus III, Augustus's son, to succeed to his father's throne; however, in the fall of 1733 the election was decided instead in favor of the French-backed Stanisław Leszczyński, the same man that had been Charles XII's puppet king during the Great Northern War. Russia and the Austrian Empire both agreed that a French-backed king of the Polish throne was unacceptable, and thus intervened to replace Stanisław with the younger Augustus.

Thus, in 1733, a Russian force under the exiled Irish general Peter Lacy invaded Poland, aiming to depose Stanisław. Lacy carefully organized a second election that proclaimed Augustus III king, and pursued the fleeing Stanisław to Danzig in early 1734 before handing off control to Münnich. France was unable to support its distant ally—the largest French force during the war, deployed off of the Baltic, consisted of just 2,000 men—and consoled itself by attacking Austria instead, sparking major action in the Rhineland and across Italy. Meanwhile, in Poland, Stanisław, unable to break the siege on Danzig, fled to France, leaving Russia to reconfirm Augustus III as king. Poland was confirmed as a Russian buffer state, and in the following decades Russian troops would intervene there at will. Lacy led troops west towards the ongoing fight between Austria and France, but did not see action before the Treaty of Vienna was ratified, ending the short war.

=== Russo-Turkish War of 1735–1739 ===
After his troops returned from Poland, Münnich quickly began planning for an expansionist campaign against Russia's old enemy the Turks and their Crimean Tatar holdings. He was provoked by constant Crimean raids into Russian territory, and by the entanglement of the Ottoman Empire in its war with Iran. Münnich was confident that the increasingly more elite Russian troops could defeat whatever the Ottomans were fielding, and thus planned an ambition campaign aimed at eventually taking control of the Ottoman capital of Istanbul. In this plan, he faced a number of strategic obstacles. The major fortress of Azov lay in the east and denied access to the Sea of Azov, and the Crimean Tatars controlled the whole of the north shore of the Black Sea. Because of the large distances involved, the Russian army would need a long supply train, and any one campaign would be vulnerable to getting cut off by actions against this baggage trail. Furthermore, the area was defended by several major rivers flowing into the Black Sea, each with Turkish fortresses alongside it.

Russo-Austrian-Turkish War, 1735–1739

Clickable imagemap of the Black Sea area during the war.

The war opened with a failed Russian raid on the Crimea in 1735, but the first major campaign did not come until 1736. Münnich divided the Russian troops into two groups, a main army under his command aiming to attack Perekop at the mouth of the Crimea, and a smaller detachment under Lacy moving towards Azov. Münnich easily stormed the Tatar defenses at Perekop in May 1736, but was unable to bring his foe to battle, as most fled for the mountains. He satisfied himself with pillaging the countryside, but his troops were suffering from thirst and disease, so he withdrew in autumn. Lacy's attack was far more successful; almost as soon as he lay siege to the fortress, its powder magazine exploded, crippling the defenders. Azov surrendered in June.

Encouraged and somewhat alarmed by the sudden Russian gains, Austria joined the war in 1736, aiming to seize control of a part of the Turkish Balkans for itself. With Azov now firmly under Russian control, the campaign shifted east along the Black Sea. Lacy infiltrated Crimea again in 1737 with 40,000 men (passing over the narrow western sandbars instead of through Perekop) and again shattered and pillaged the region, but as with Münnich's attack the previous year, suffered from disease and thirst, and thus was forced to withdraw. Meanwhile, Münnich and 80,000 men crossed the Southern Bug upstream of the major Turkish fortress at Ochakiv, before doubling back and laying siege to it. A lucky shot during the bombardment again burst the fortress's powder magazine, and Ochakiv was surrendered to the Russians soon afterwards.

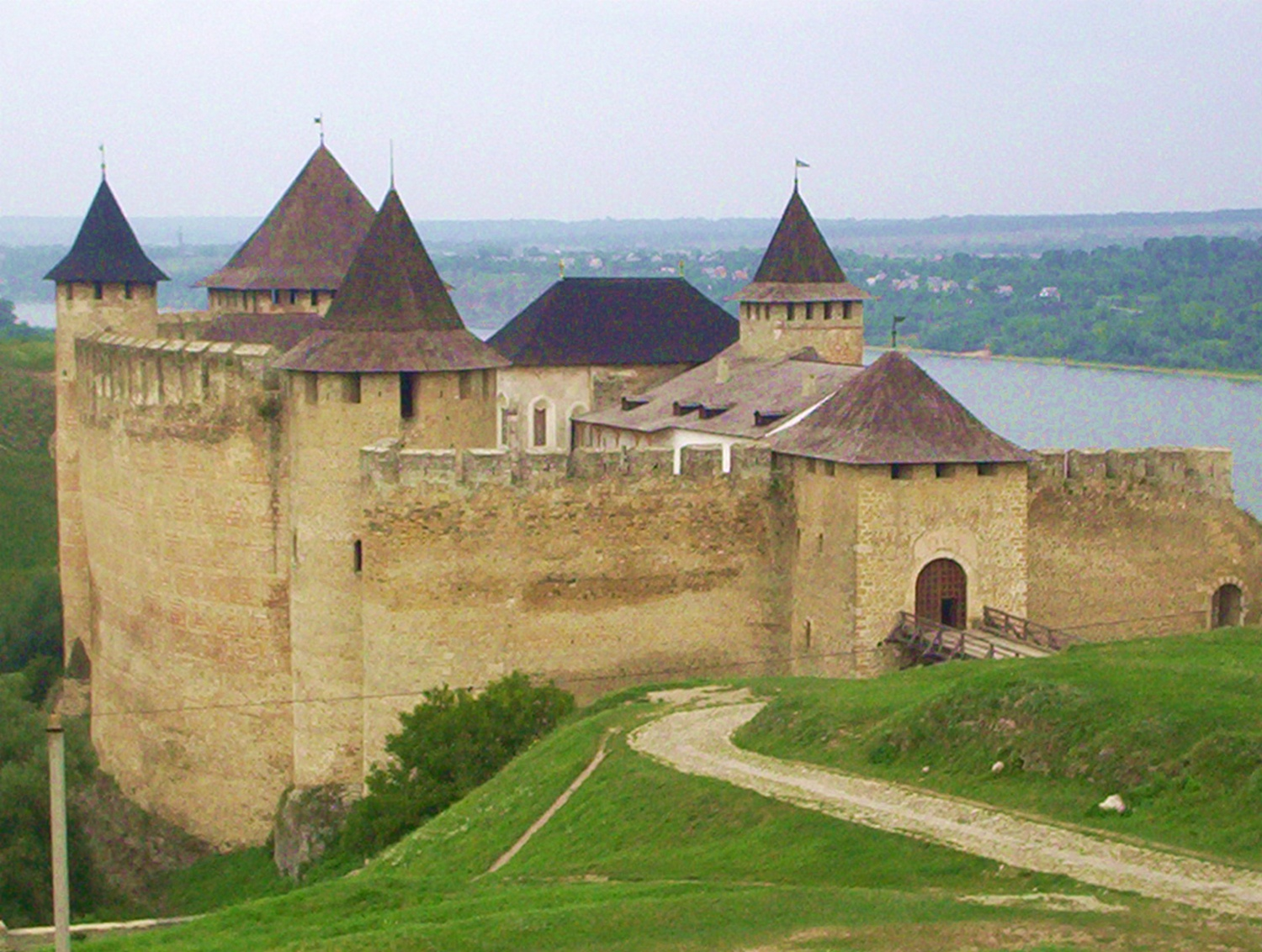
Khotyn Fortress, now a national landmark in Ukraine

1738 proved inconclusive for the Russians. Lacy once again invaded Crimea for the third time, and once again produced no lasting results. Münnich marched down the west coast of the Black Sea and crossed the Dnestr with 100,000 men, but again, disease (this time the plague), a shortage of supplies, and harassment by the Turkish screening force quickly forced him to withdraw north. To circumvent this problem, in 1739 Münnich cut even further west of the west bank of the Black Sea, skirting through Poland before arriving at the Prut. However, the situation proved to be a repeat of Peter the Great's campaign in 1711; once again the Russian's supply line was cut by encircling Turkish cavalry. Confident that he could break through this trap once he needed to, on 28 August 1737 (N.S.) he attacked the main Turkish encampment at Stavuchany. Münnich landed a diversionary blow to the Turkish right flank, then massed troops on its right and smashed through the Turks, capturing the Turkish encampment, artillery, supplies, and the Khotyn Fortress on the upper Dnestr.

Still, the battle was a hollow victory. Austria signed peace with the Ottomans that year, and without an ally and unsure of further gains, Russia was decided to sign the Treaty of Niš and end its war. The army had suffered enormously from disease, and for all the men and money that the war cost Russia only gained some sparsely populated steppe north of the Black Sea, and the old prize of Azov, under the condition that it would remain unfortified. Still, the war did demonstrate two things. Firstly, it showed how much the Russian army had advanced, as it easily beat back larger Ottoman forces during the war; Münnich had been overly ambitious, but his assumptions on the superiority of his troops were not misplaced. Secondly, it established and maintained the pattern that would develop in future wars between the Turks and the Russians: early Russian gains on river fortresses were to be nullified by the impact of disease, and deeper attacks cut off from their supply train by fast-moving Turkish and Tatar cavalry.

== Elizabeth ==
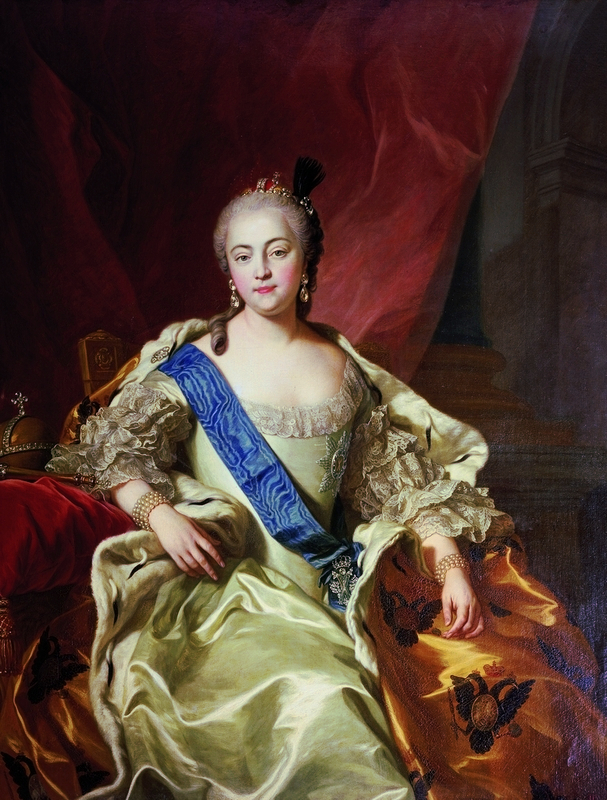
Portrait of Elizabeth by Charles van Loo. Portrayals of her universally stressed her kindness and femininity.

Anna I died in autumn 1740. Shortly before her death, she had appointed her infant grandnephew, son of her niece, Princess of Mecklenburg, Ivan VI, as tsar, and nominated her old favorite Biron as the regent. The gesture did not save Biron from the many enemies he had made over the course of Anna's rule, and he was exiled to Siberia within three weeks of her death. Regency was taken up by Ivan's mother Anna Leopoldovna. This arrangement did not either. Noting her cousin's distaste for her and consolidating her control over the guards, Peter the Great's daughter, Elizabeth, executed a bloodless coup and took the throne. Anna and the infant Ivan were carried away and imprisoned, and Elizabeth arrested all her known and suspected opponents along the way.

Elizabeth had been brought up in relative quiet, and from early childhood had been praised for her beauty. Her interests were clothes, shopping, dancing, and men, and throughout her reign she had an extremely public and extremely long list of suitors. Nonetheless, she did much to reincarnate Peter's reign; upon gaining the throne, she immediately restored the Senate and scattered Anna's German administration, sentencing both Münnich and Ostermann to death (a sentence commuted to exile at the scaffold). By scattering the hated Germans and projecting an image of beauty and affection, Elizabeth maintained one of the most popular public images among the Russian populace at the time. She entrusted much of her administration to Alexey Bestuzhev-Ryumin, a man she personally disliked, but whose skills she shrewdly understood were needed by the state.

=== Russo–Swedish War of 1741–1743 ===
The political turmoil of 1741 had given Sweden hopes of retribution for its losses in the Great Northern War. Sweden had additionally been egged on by French diplomats aiming to keep Russia out of the War of Austrian Succession. Sweden had declared war on Russia, moving troops towards Saint Petersburg. It thinly justified the war with support for Elizabeth's taking of the throne, and Elizabeth promised to cede certain Russian territories in return. Once securely on the throne, however, Elizabeth rejected the terms and direct her military against the woefully unprepared Swedes.

Peter Lacy led the invasion of Finland, defended by only a tiny force, in the fall of 1741. He aimed specifically to destroy as much of the countryside as he could, skillfully using Cossacks to the best of their raiding abilities. Seeing that its ally would be crushed, France tried to mediate peace, but to no avail. Lacy coordinated a second march in 1742, keeping along the coast of Finland so as to pin down the 17,000 Swedish troops, an objective he achieved at Helsingfors (Helsinki). The Swedes surrendered, and Lacy occupied both Helsingfors and Åbo (Turku), the administrative center of Finland. By 1743, with Swedish defeat complete and fears of a coalition to defend Sweden growing, Elizabeth finally brought Sweden to the bargaining table. In the resultant Treaty of Åbo, Elizabeth was surprisingly generous, taking several providences of Eastern Finland but allowing Sweden to retain the bulk of its control.

=== Seven Years' War ===
==== Prelude ====
Alliance systems of the Seven Years' War

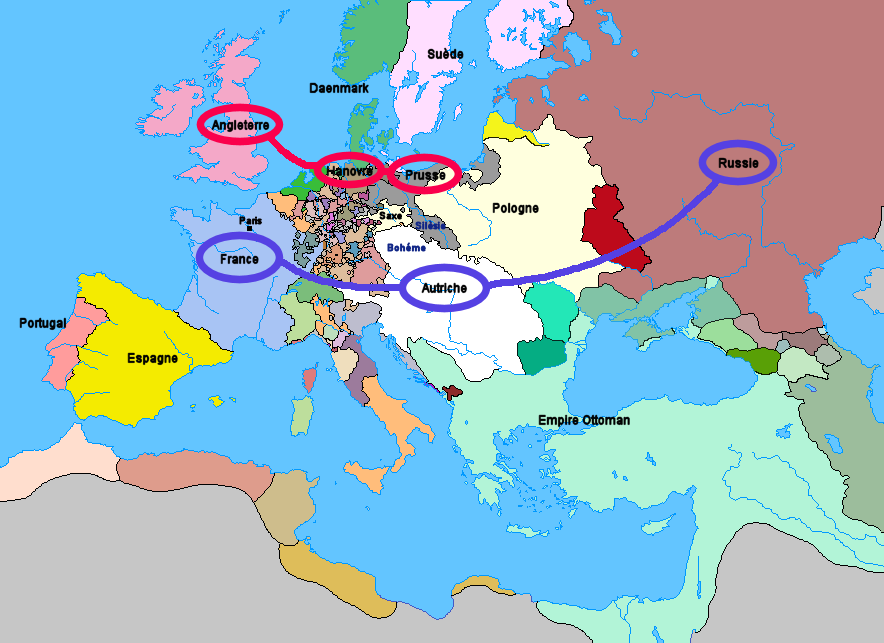
The basic Franco-Austrian-Russian and British-Prussian-Hanoverian alliances that arose out the Diplomatic Revolution

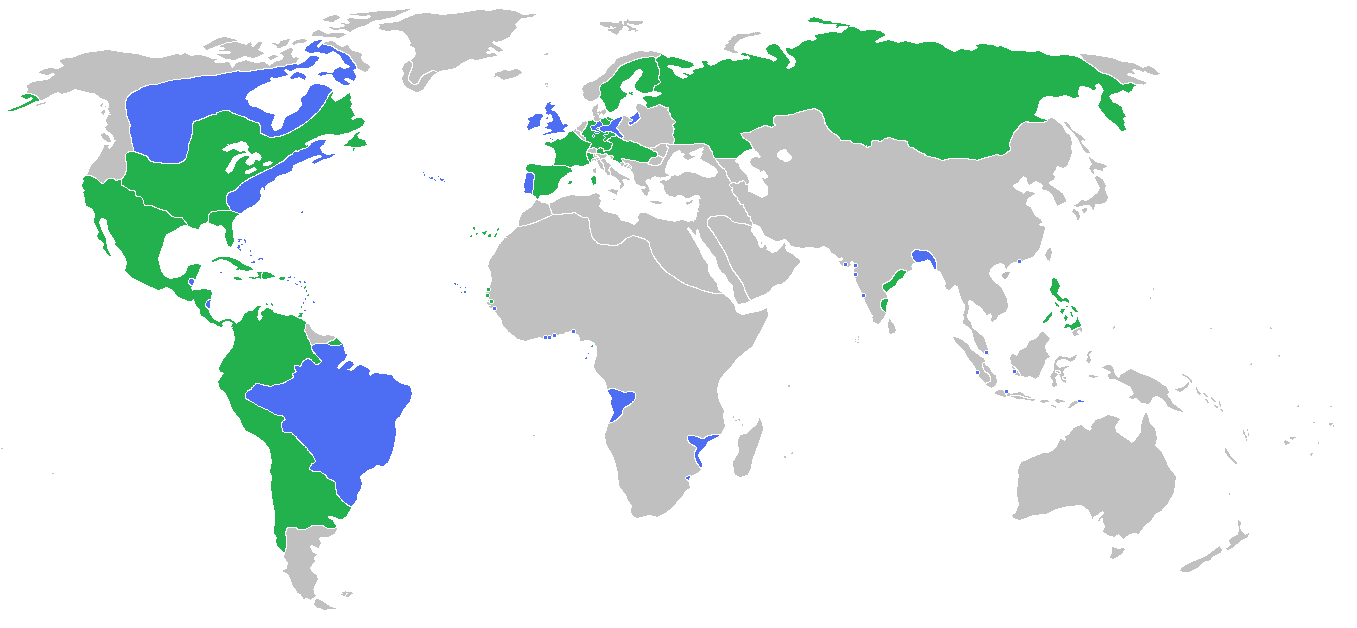
Map of the countries and their territories involved in the war.
Great Britain, Prussia, Portugal, with allies
France, Spain, Austria, Russia, Sweden with allies
Spain allied itself with the French and attacked Portugal in 1762, bringing those two powers into the conflict as well.

The 1740s and 1750s marked growing tensions across Europe. A key event in this instability was the sudden and meteoric rise of Prussia; under a series of careful and powerful kings, the state had consolidated power in upper Germany, and risen to a prominence far exceeding its actual land area. Fredrick the Great, who ruled Prussia at the time, drilled his military ceaselessly. One of his key innovations was oblique battle order, whereupon he purposely overloaded one flank while weakening the other; if the weakened flank held, the stronger side would be able to break through the enemy and surround them. Such a maneuver required precise timing and great skill, things his highly skilled army very much possessed.

The sudden growth of Prussia shifted the balance of power in Europe greatly. Britain and the Austrian Empire had cultivated an alliance against France for many years, but this was suddenly broken when Austria shifted its center of interest away from France, and from protecting its vulnerable colonies in the west, to the rising power of Prussia in the north. Russia, meanwhile, had clashed with France time and time again, and was searching for allies against an increasingly diplomatically aggressive France and an increasingly powerful Prussia. Thus Alexey Bestuzhev-Ryumin attempted to build an alliance with Russia's "natural friends," Britain and Austria, against its "natural enemies," France and Prussia. Austria and Russia signed a cornerstone defensive alliance in 1725, but Britain was cautious about such an alliance. Realizing the opportunity, Fredrick sidestepped his French allies and signed the Treaty of Westminster with Britain in 1756. France quickly shot back at Prussia by signing an alliance with Austria, an alliance that Russia, with the caveat of non-aggression against Poland, now joined. This so-called Diplomatic Revolution set the stage for the coming Seven Years' War, and Europe sunk into an uneasy peace.

With the dismissal of Münnich, Elizabeth entrusted control of the Russian military to Peter Ivanovich Shuvalov. Shuvalov quickly eliminated the German dress that had been introduced under Münnich. Foreseeing the approach of war in the 1750s, Shuvalov worked to improve the Russian army on the Prussian model. He drilled the army in the same tactics used by Fredrick the Great, but his success carried more to his cavalry then to the infantry, as Russia lacked the officer expertise to fully achieve the Prussian model. He also worked to convert dragoons into heavier cuirassiers and mounted grenadiers, capable of shock attacks that the lighter dragoons could not muster. He also worked to improve Russian artillery, even introducing some innovations of his own design, although he tended to get carried away by technical gimmicks.

==== 1756–1757 and the battle of Gross-Jägersdorf ====
The armed peace that Europe fell into did not last. Fredrick anticipated an attack against him, something he preempted by occupying Saxony in the summer of 1756, thereby removing the threat of a direct Austro-Russian attack against his capital of Berlin. The war began in earnest in 1757, and immediately split into two theaters: a power struggle in continental Europe between Prussia, Austria, and Russia, and a colonial war in North America between France and Britain (known in American history as the French and Indian War). Britain concentrated on using its naval superiority and relatively small army in fighting its colonial war, a move that France mirrored. Thus, the bulk of continental fighting was taken up by the Austrian-Russian alliance against Prussia.

Despite enormous differences in land area, Prussia's position was not as hopeless as it might have seemed. Russian and Austrian strategic goals differed, with Russia concerned mainly with East Prussia and Austria, Silesia. The two countries often attempted to pass the burden of battle to one another. Thus Fredrick's strategy of constantly shifting his army, although tiresome for the troops, successfully keep both of his enemies at bay. British financial contributions and the overall superiority of the Prussian army further alleviated the Austrian-Russian size advantage.

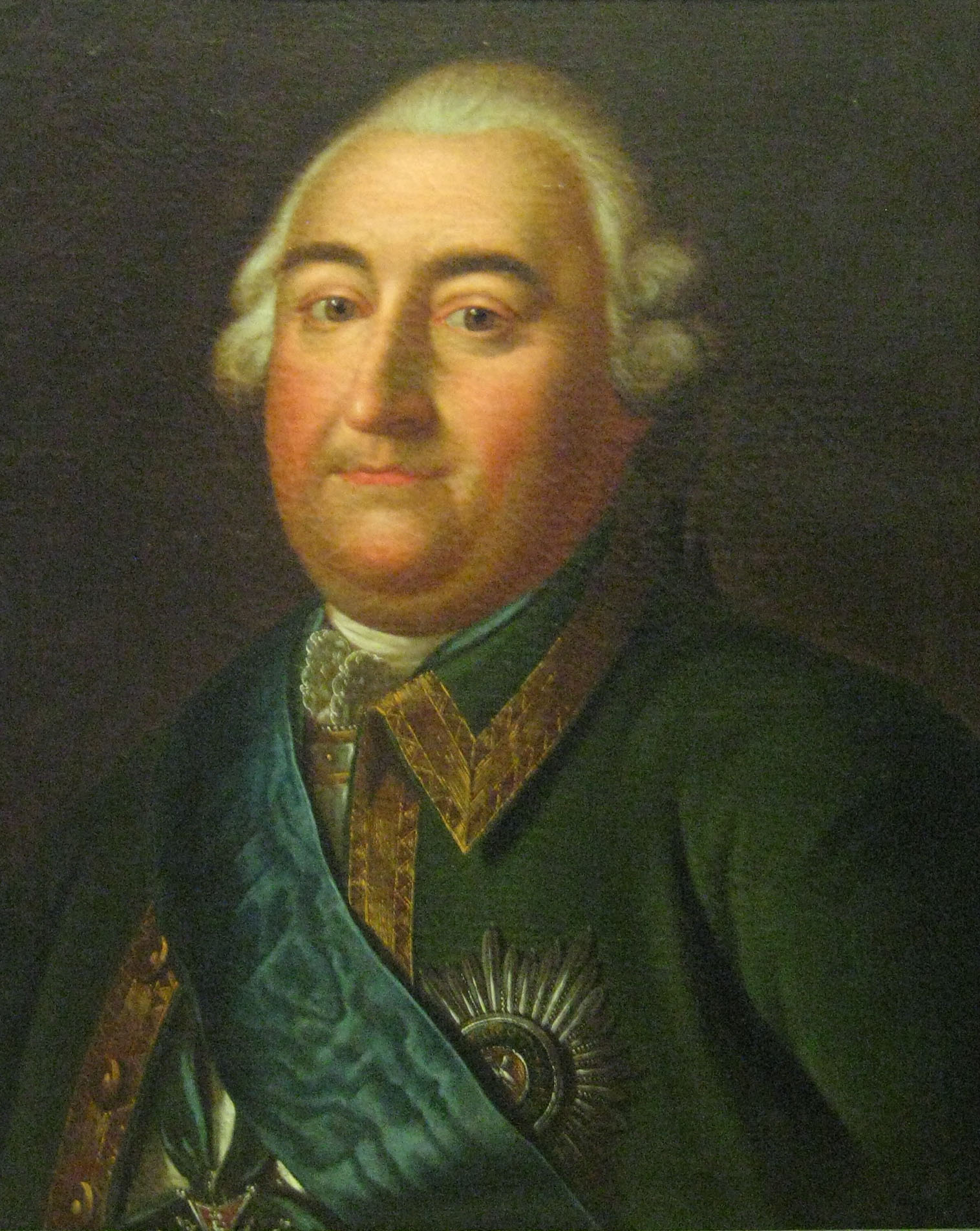
Stepan Fyodorovich Apraksin's cautious tactics and lack of initiative led to the Battle of Gross-Jägersdorf, which nearly jeopardized Russia's position in the Seven Years' War. He was later put on trial for his ineptitude before conveniently dying in jail in 1758.

The war intensified in 1757 with an Austrian invasion of Prussia. Fredrick countered this army by organizing his own, 100,000 strong, and invading the Austrian Bohemia in four columns. The Austrians abandoned their invasion plans in favor of defense, organizing their army into a long brittle column along the border. After a fairly easy breakthrough, the Austrians fell into a disorderly retreat, and Fredrick began to advance on the Austrian capital of Prague, while also diverting forces to harass the French. Fredrick defeated the main Austrian army outside Prague in a bloody and close fought battle and laid siege to the Austrian capital. However, in June, an equally bloody battle at Kolín forced Fredrick to withdraw back north. While his southern operations were going sour, a French army invaded Germany from the west, defeating Prussia's British and Hanoverian allies along the way.

While war was intensifying in Europe, the sluggish Russian army was still slowly advancing towards its target, the militarily isolated East Prussia. East Prussia was lightly garrisoned, and should not have been a significant threat to the 100,000 strong Russian force, led by Stepan Fyodorovich Apraksin. Apraksin was a well-connected diplomat in the tsarina's court with little true military experience. He moved his forces cautiously, at a pace that nearly proved disastrous. On 19/30 August 1757, a Prussian force caught the Russians marching off-guard at the small village of Gross-Jägersdorf. In the ensuing battle, the Prussian force, outnumbered 2 to 1, encircled both flanks of the Russian column (which stretched for over 2 miles) with cavalry, and Prussian infantry marched through the woods to attack the Russians in the center. The Prussians threatened to do what the Swedes had done at Narva, roll through the frantically redeploying Russians and then crush their individual units.

The situation was salvaged only by a one Pyotr Rumyantsev, later to become Catherine the Great's foremost general; he rallied the Russian forces in the center, driving the Prussians back and ending the threat of a decisive breakthrough and defeat. With the Russian columns, particularly the artillery, now grinding back at their attackers, the Prussians were forced to retreat from battle. Losses had been roughly even, but the small Prussian force could ill afford its casualties. Apraksin, horrified by the losses, lacked the stomach to make good on his victory, and retreated to winter quarters, making the battle one of the most casual victories in Russian history. He was later relieved of command and put on trial for his heinous lack of initiative, dying in prison the next year.

Overall, 1757 was a grim year for Fredrick. Prussia's lightning attack on Austria, which had meant to knock Austria out of the war while the other nations mobilized, had failed. He now faced confrontation with three great powers with an empty treasury, and a monetary toll that the small Prussian population could ill afford. Austrian forces were quickly recapturing Silesian fortresses, and the region capitulated into Austrian hands. Austrian raids even reached Fredrick's capital city, Berlin.

==== 1758 and the battle of Zorndorf ====
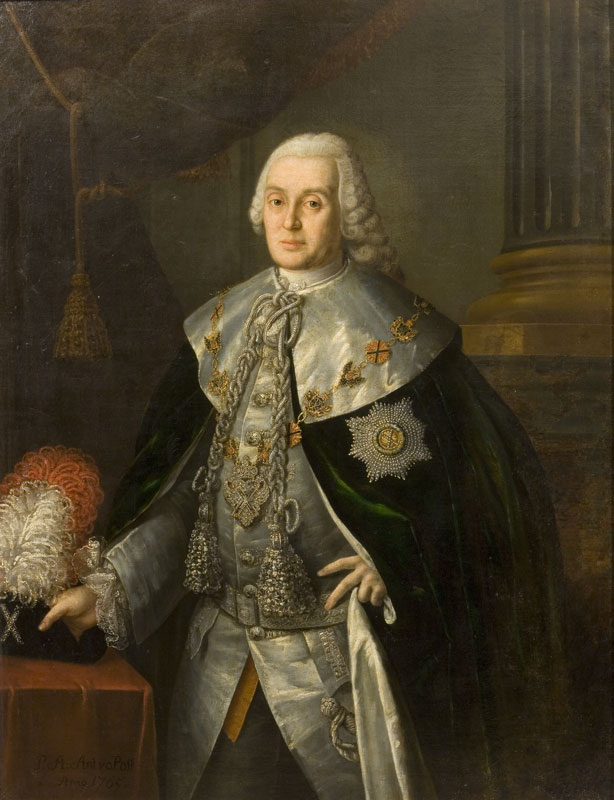
Portrait of William Fermor painted by Aleksey Antropov

1758 brought new campaigns in Europe, and for Prussia, new hope. Fredrick coordinated a spectacular victory over the French at Rossbach, one he followed with costlier but equally decisive victory over the Austrians at Leuthen. His position on his western and southern flanks was now temporarily secure, and British funds, impressed by the Prussian victories, were now pouring in again.

Following Apraksin's removal, command of the Russian field forces was transferred to William Fermor. Fermor, a clean-cut and intelligent Baltic German and a student of Lacy and Münnich, made his soldiers' welfare one of his primary concerns. Fermor's troops made quick work of the East Prussian providences that Apraskin had found so vexing. Seeing that he was unable to reclaim East Prussia, Fredrick turned his attention to the Austrians, invading the providence of Moravia. However, the Austrians refused to engage him in battle, and therefore he could not land any of the spectacular victories that had salvaged his strategic nightmare so far. Realizing that further advances were futile, by late summer Fredrick had turned his attention squarely back towards the Russians.

Frederick met Fermor's troops on the marshes outside the hamlet of Zorndorf, east of the Oder River. Frederick planned to take his enemy by surprise by marching around the Russian rear to the south under the cover of night; however, the next morning the Russian forces simply reversed direction and faced their foe, now to the south, once more. Although the Prussians lost the element of surprise, the Russians were now in a vulnerable position, as their backs now stood against the river and the surrounding swamp. On 25 August 1758, following 2 hours of bombardment, the Prussian left engaged the Russians in what quickly became a murderous exchange of volleys. However, Frederick's left column, intending to support attack on the Russian right, instead drifted towards the center and stalled out in the engagement. Fermor quickly took advantage of this and sent his cavalry charging through the weakened left flank and sent it backwards in disorder, but their advantage was neutralized by a prompt counterattack by the Prussian cavalry. The battle degenerated into disorganized attrition, and the two bloodied forces did not break off until night fell. Thus the Battle of Zorndorf ended with 30,000 casualties total out of a total of 80,000 men, and both sides withdrew by the next morning.

Fermor withdrew east (in fact fleeing long before his army withdrew from Zorndorf), leaving the Prussians with the chance to move south and meet the Austrian offensive once again. Frederick once again nearly met disaster when his army, encamped at Hochkirch, was nearly overrun by the Austrians. Although he escaped with the majority of his forces intact, by the end of the year it was clear that the Prussian's military situation had not improved; rather, Frederick had lost many of his best troops, and the Russians and Austrians had demonstrated a newfound ability to nullify his tactics.

==== Later campaigns ====
Russia continued its alliance with Austria, but Austria shifted to an alliance with France against Prussia. In 1759 Russian and Austrian forces decisively defeated Frederick at Kunersdorf and in 1760 captured Berlin. Fortunately for the Kingdom of Prussia, Elizabeth died in 1762, and her successor, Peter III, allied Russia with Prussia because of his devotion to the Prussian king, Frederick the Great.

==== Aftermath ====
The Seven Years' War was the first war that Russia, previously embroiled in conflicts with its neighbors, fought against a first-class European army since Peter the Great, and the results were mixed. Russian troops demonstrated immense personal courage and bravado, standing before withering volleys of fire without flinching. The command structure did not fare nearly so well; overall coordination fell to Bestuzhev-Riumin and a court conference, which quickly proved to be inefficient, spending much of time engrossed in micromanaging the army. The Russian officer corps had been fashioned into an elite force during Peter the Great's reign, but his policies had been abolished and command corps had fallen into disrepair. The result was that, although Russia won several important victories against the Prussians, it never fully capitalized on its success. This problem was compounded by the insufficiency of the Russian supply line, which forced the Russians to withdraw every winter.

== Peter III ==
Peter III had a short and unpopular reign. Although he was a grandson of Peter the Great, his father was the duke of Holstein-Gottorp, so Peter III was raised in a German Lutheran environment. Russians therefore considered him a foreigner. Making no secret of his contempt for all things Russian, Peter created deep resentment by forcing Prussian military drills on the Russian military, attacking the Russian Orthodox Church, and depriving Russia of a military victory by establishing his sudden alliance with Prussia. Making use of the discontent and fearing for her own position, Peter III's wife, Catherine, deposed her husband in a coup, and her lover, Aleksey Orlov, subsequently murdered him, so in June 1762 Catherine became Catherine II, empress of Russia.

== Russian imperial expansion and maturation ==
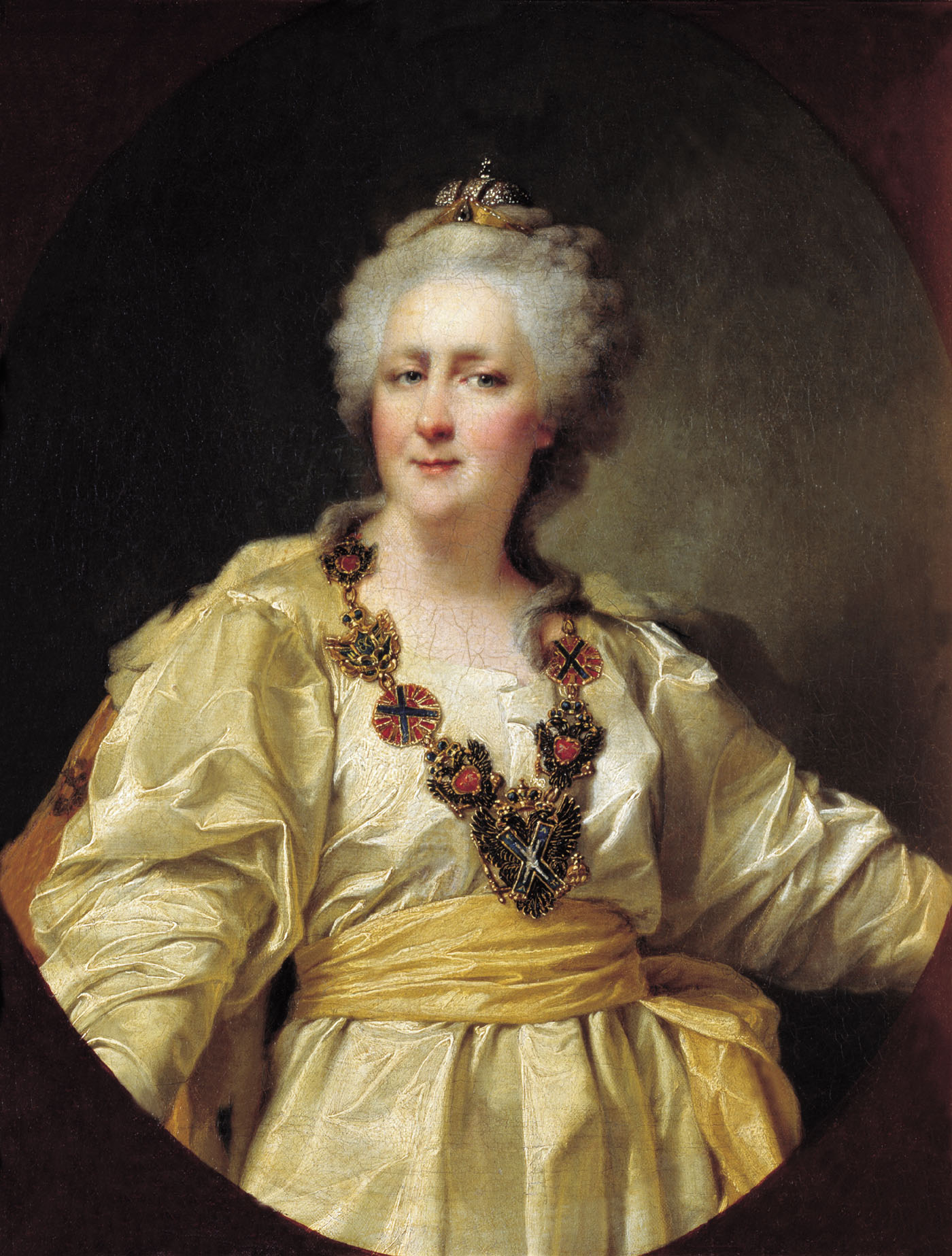
Catherine the Great of Russia

Catherine II's reign featured imperial expansion, which brought the empire huge new territories in the south and west; and internal consolidation. Following the outbreak of the Russo-Turkish War with the Ottoman Empire in 1768, the parties agreed to the Treaty of Kuchuk-Kainarji in 1774. By that treaty, Russia acquired an outlet to the Black Sea, and the Crimean Tatars became independent of the Ottomans. During this war, the Russians inflicted the most crushing naval defeat in the history of Russian military: the battle of Chesma. In 1783 Catherine annexed the Crimea, helping to spark the next Russo-Turkish War with the Ottoman Empire, which began in 1787. By the Treaty of Jassy in 1792, Russia expanded southward to the Dniestr river. The terms of the treaty fell far short of the goals of Catherine's reputed "Greek project": the expulsion of the Ottomans from Europe and the renewal of a Byzantine Empire under Russian control. The Ottoman Empire no longer posed a serious threat to Russia, however, and had to tolerate an increasing Russian influence over the Balkans.

=== Partition of Poland ===
Russia's westward expansion under Catherine resulted from the partitioning of Poland. As Poland became increasingly weak in the eighteenth century, each of its neighbors—Russia, Prussia, and Austria—tried to place its own candidate on the Polish throne. In 1772 the three agreed on an initial partition of Polish territory, by which Russia received parts of Belarus and Livonia. After the partition, Poland initiated an extensive reform program, which included a democratic constitution that alarmed reactionary factions in Poland and in Russia. Using the danger of radicalism as an excuse, the same three powers abrogated the constitution and in 1793 again stripped Poland of territory. This time Russia obtained most of Belarus and Ukraine west of the Dnieper river. The 1793 partition led to an anti-Russian and anti-Prussian uprising in Poland, which ended with the third partition in 1795. The Russians took Praga, a suburb of Warsaw, after a fierce battle. As a result of the third partition, Poland disappeared from the international political map.

Although the partitioning of Poland greatly added to Russia's territory and prestige, it also created new difficulties. Having lost Poland as a buffer, Russia now had to share borders with both Prussia and Austria. In addition, the empire became more ethnically heterogeneous as it absorbed large numbers of Poles, Ukrainians, Belarusians, and Jews. The fate of the Ukrainians and Belarusians, who primarily worked as serfs, changed little at first under Russian rule. Roman Catholic Poles resented their loss of independence, however, and proved difficult to integrate.

=== Pugachev Revolt and Alexander Suvorov ===
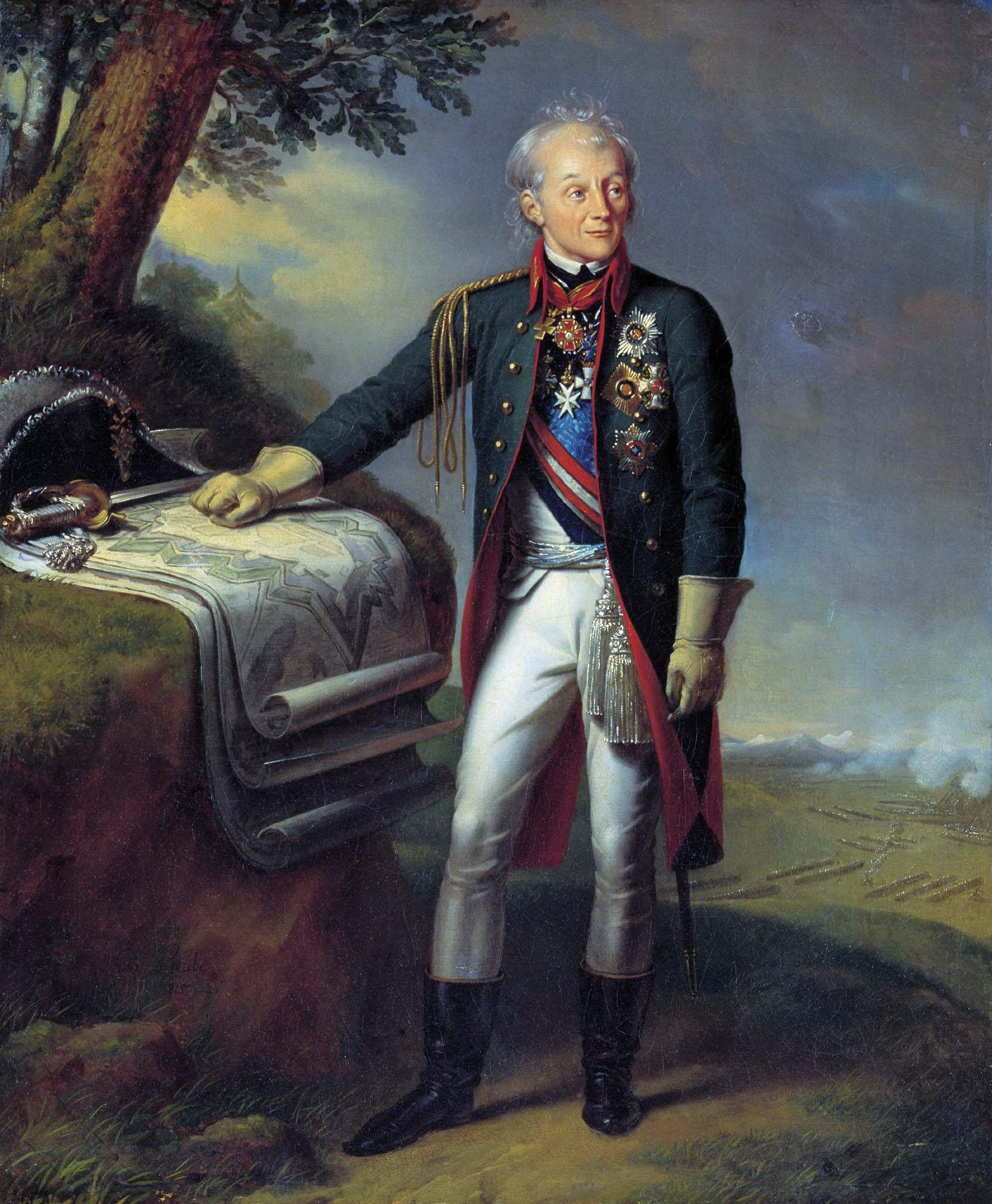
Suvorov by Charles de Steuben

During the 1768–1774 war with the Ottoman Empire, Russia experienced a major social upheaval, the Pugachev Uprising. In 1773 a Don Cossack, Yemelyan Pugachev, declared himself as the re-emergent tsar Peter III. Other Cossacks, various Turkic tribes that felt the impingement of the Russian centralizing state, and industrial workers in the Ural Mountains, as well as peasants hoping to escape serfdom, all joined in the rebellion. Russia's preoccupation with the war enabled Pugachev to take control of a part of the Volga area, but the regular army crushed the rebellion in 1774.

The history of the Russian army in this era was linked to the name of Alexander Suvorov a Russian general, reckoned one of a few great generals in history who never lost a battle. From 1777 to 1783 Suvorov served in the Crimea and in the Caucasus, becoming a lieutenant-general in 1780, and general of infantry in 1783, on the conclusion of his work there (see also Kuban Nogai uprising). From 1787 to 1791 he again fought the Turks during the Russo-Turkish War of 1787–1792 and won many victories, such as Izmail and Rymnik. Suvorov's leadership also played a key role in Russian victory over Poles during the Kościuszko Uprising, notably at the battle of Praga.

=== After Catherine ===
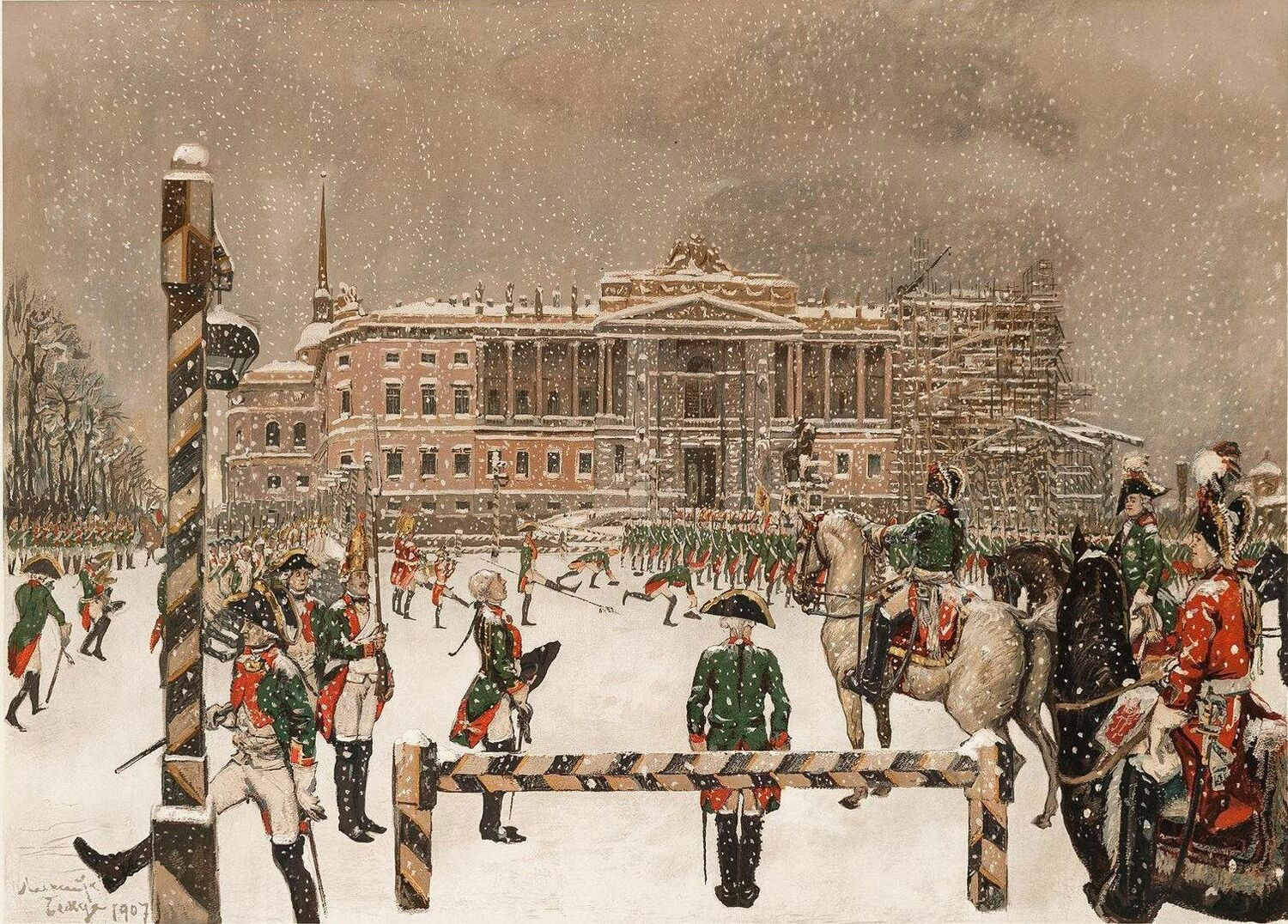
Paul's Military Parade beside the Saint Michael's Castle, by Alexandre Benois.

Catherine II died in 1796, and her son Paul (r. 1796–1801) succeeded her. His independent conduct of the foreign affairs of Russia plunged the country first into the Second Coalition against France in 1798, and then into the armed neutrality against Britain in 1801. The new emperor drilled the Russian army on the Prussian model, which resulted in conflict with Suvorov and his subsequent removal and self-imposed exile. However, he was recalled to the army in 1798–1799 Russian troops led by Suvorov performed brilliantly in Italy and Switzerland — especially at the battle of the Trebbia.

During the early nineteenth century, Russia's population, resources, international diplomacy, and military forces made it one of the most powerful states in the world. Its power enabled it to play an increasingly assertive role in Europe's affairs. This role drew the empire into a series of wars against Napoleon, which had far-reaching consequences for Russia and the rest of Europe. After a period of enlightenment, Russia became an active opponent of liberalizing trends in Central and Western Europe.

== Napoleonic Wars ==
As a major European power, Russia could not escape the wars involving revolutionary and Napoleonic France. Paul became an adamant opponent of France, and Russia joined Britain and Austria in a war against France. Paul's support for the ideals of the Knights Hospitaller (and his acceptance of the position of Grand Master) alienated many members of his court. Along with his liberal policies towards the lower classes, and his discovery of corruption in the treasury, his zeal for reform sealed his fate. In March 1801, Paul was assassinated by a handful of nobles and disgruntled officers. The new tsar, Alexander I of Russia (r. 1801–1825), came to the throne as the result of his father's murder, in which he was rumored to be implicated.

Alexander's primary focus was not on domestic policy but on foreign affairs, and particularly on Napoleon. Fearing Napoleon's expansionist ambitions and the growth of French power, Alexander joined Britain and Austria against Napoleon. Napoleon defeated the Russians and Austrians at Austerlitz in 1805 and trounced the Russians at Friedland in 1807. Alexander was forced to sue for peace, and by the Treaty of Tilsit, signed in 1807, he became Napoleon's ally. Russia lost little territory under the treaty, and Alexander made use of his alliance with Napoleon for further expansion. By the Finnish War he wrested Finland from Sweden in 1809, and acquired Bessarabia from Turkey in 1812.

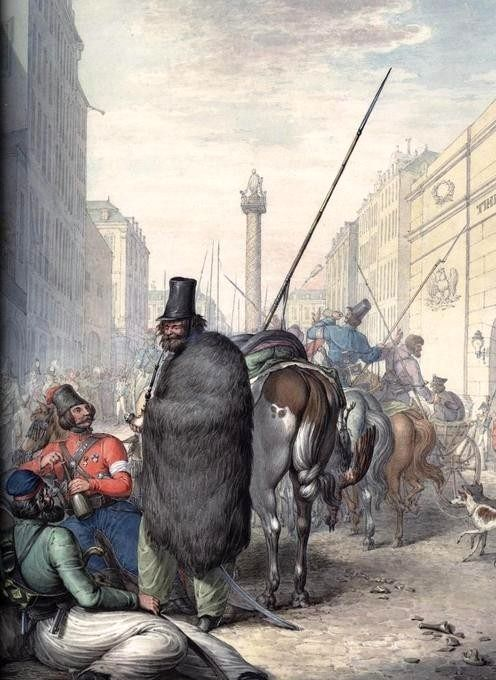
Russian Cossacks in Paris in 1814

The Russo-French alliance gradually became strained. Napoleon was concerned about Russia's intentions in the strategically vital Bosporus and Dardanelles straits. At the same time, Alexander viewed the Grand Duchy of Warsaw, the French-controlled reconstituted Polish state, with suspicion. The requirement of joining France's Continental Blockade against Britain was a serious disruption of Russian commerce, and in 1810 Alexander repudiated the obligation.

In 1812, Napoleon invaded Russia to compel Emperor Alexander I to remain in the Continental System and to remove the imminent threat of Russian invasion of Poland. The Grande Armée, 650,000 men (270,000 Frenchmen and many soldiers of allies or subject powers), crossed the Niemen River on June 23, 1812. Russia proclaimed a Patriotic War, while Napoleon proclaimed a Second Polish war, but against the expectations of the Poles who supplied almost 100,000 troops for the invasion force he avoided any concessions toward Poland, having in mind further negotiations with Russia. Russia maintained a scorched earth policy of retreat broken only by the battle of Borodino (September 7), when the Russians stood and fought. This was bloody and the Russians were eventually forced to back down and open the road to Moscow. By September 14, Moscow was captured although by this point it had been largely abandoned by the Russians and prisoners had been released from Moscow's prisons to inconvenience the French. Alexander I refused to capitulate and with no sign of clear victory in sight Napoleon was forced to withdraw from Moscow after the city had been burnt to the ground. The conflicting sides placed the blame for the fire on each other. So the disastrous Great Retreat began, with 370,000 casualties largely as a result of starvation and the freezing weather conditions, and 200,000 captured. By November only 27,000 fit soldiers were among those who crossed the Berezina River. Napoleon now left his army to return to Paris and prepare a defence of Poland from the advancing Russians.

As the French retreated, the Russians pursued them into Central and Western Europe and to the gates of Paris. After the allies defeated Napoleon, Alexander became known as the savior of Europe, and he played a prominent role in the redrawing of the map of Europe at the Congress of Vienna in 1815. In the same year Alexander initiated the creation of the Holy Alliance, a loose agreement pledging the rulers of the nations involved—including most of Europe—to act according to Christian principles. More pragmatically, in 1814 Russia, Britain, Austria, and Prussia had formed the Quadruple Alliance. The allies created an international system to maintain the territorial status quo and prevent the resurgence of an expansionist France. The Quadruple Alliance, confirmed by a number of international conferences, ensured Russia's influence in Europe.

See also

- Mikhail Illarionovich Kutuzov
- Michael Andreas Barclay de Tolly
- Aleksey Petrovich Yermolov

Decembrists at the Senate Square

== 1815–1856 ==
=== Decembrists' Revolt ===
At the same time, Russia continued its expansion. The Congress of Vienna created the Kingdom of Poland (Russian Poland), to which Alexander granted a constitution. Thus, Alexander I became the constitutional monarch of Poland while remaining the autocratic tsar of Russia. He was also the limited monarch of Finland, which had been annexed in 1809 and awarded autonomous status. In 1813 Russia gained territory in the Baku area of the Caucasus at the expense of Qajar Iran. By the early nineteenth century, the empire also was firmly ensconced in Alaska.

Historians have generally agreed that a revolutionary movement was born during the reign of Alexander I. Young officers who had pursued Napoleon into Western Europe came back to Russia with revolutionary ideas. The intellectual modernization that had been fostered in the 18th century by a paternalistic, autocratic Russian state now included opposition to autocracy, demands for representative government, calls for the abolition of serfdom, and, in some instances, advocacy of a revolutionary overthrow of the government. Officers were particularly incensed that Alexander had granted Poland a constitution while Russia remained without one. Several clandestine organizations were preparing for an uprising when Alexander died unexpectedly in 1825. Following his death, there was confusion about who would succeed him because the next in line, his brother Constantine, had relinquished his right to the throne. A group of officers commanding about 3,000 men refused to swear allegiance to the new tsar, Alexander's brother Nicholas, proclaiming instead their loyalty to the idea of a Russian constitution. Because these events occurred in December 1825, the rebels were called Decembrists. Nicholas easily overcame the revolt, and the Decembrists who remained alive were arrested. Many were exiled to Siberia. To some extent, the Decembrists were in the tradition of a long line of palace revolutionaries who wanted to place their candidate on the throne. But because the Decembrists also wanted to implement a liberal political program, their revolt has been considered the beginning of a revolutionary movement. The Decembrist Revolt was the first open breach between the government and liberal elements, a breach that would subsequently widen.

=== Weakness of the army ===
Tsar Nicholas I (reigned 1825–1855) lavished attention on his very large army; with a population of 60–70 million people, the army included a million men. They had outdated equipment and tactics, but the tsar, who dressed like a soldier and surrounded himself with officers, gloried in the victory over Napoleon in 1812 and took enormous pride in its smartness on parade. The cavalry horses, for example, were only trained in parade formations, and did poorly in battle. The glitter and braid masked profound weaknesses that he did not see. He put generals in charge of most of his civilian agencies regardless of their qualifications. An agnostic who won fame in cavalry charges was made supervisor of Church affairs. The Army became the vehicle of upward social mobility for noble youths from non-Russian areas, such as Poland, the Baltic, Finland and Georgia. On the other hand, many miscreants, petty criminals and undesirables were punished by local officials by enlisting them for life in the Army. The conscription system was highly unpopular with people, as was the practice of forcing peasants to house the soldiers for six months of the year. Curtiss finds that "The pedantry of Nicholas' military system, which stressed unthinking obedience and parade ground evolutions rather than combat training, produced ineffective commanders in time of war." His commanders in the Crimean War were old and incompetent, and indeed so were his muskets as the colonels sold the best equipment and the best food.

Finally the Crimean war at the end of his reign demonstrated to the world what no one had previously realized: Russia was militarily weak, technologically backward, and administratively incompetent. Despite his grand ambitions toward the south and Turkey, Russia had not built its railroad network in that direction, and communications were bad. The bureaucracy was riddled with graft, corruption and inefficiency and was unprepared for war. The Navy was weak and technologically backward; the Army, although very large, was good only for parades, suffered from colonels who pocketed their men's pay, poor morale, and was even more out of touch with the latest technology as developed by Britain and France. As Fuller notes, "Russia had been beaten on the Crimean peninsula, and the military feared that it would inevitably be beaten again unless steps were taken to surmount its military weakness."

== 1856–1917 ==
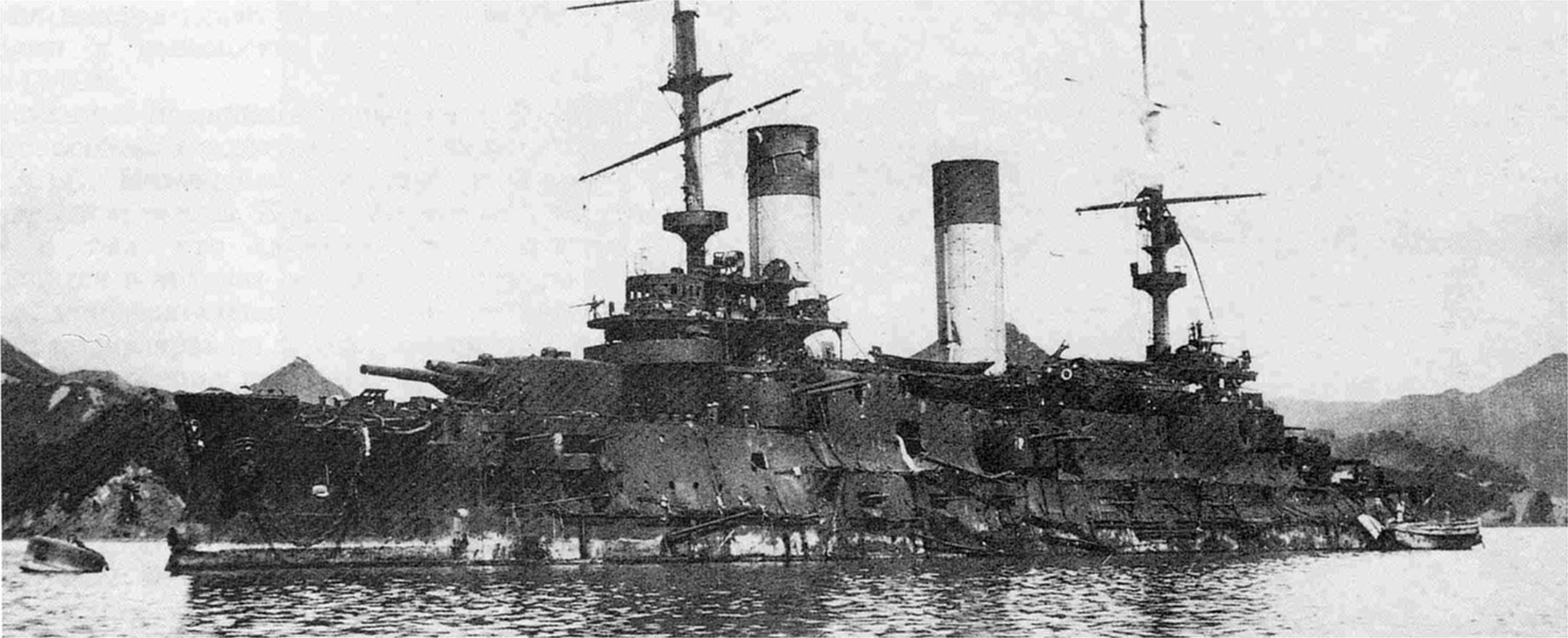
Damage to the battleship Oryol following the Battle of Tsushima

The ensuing defeat of Russia in the Crimean War promulgated new reforms under Tsar Alexander II, who delegated the effort to Count Dmitry Milyutin, the Minister of War. Both branches of the imperial military had a shortage of noncommissioned officers, with virtually no one aside from a few special units being composed of individuals who did not want to become an officer. Following the Crimean conflict, there were three main sources of officers in the Russian army; the Page Corps, the cadet corps, and the junker military schools, while for the navy, it was their cadet corps. He also finally gave the army permanent barracks, previously, they had used only dugouts and shacks. Milyutin's reforms molded the Tsarist military into what it would be for the rest of Tsarist Russia's existence.

As Russia began to focus more on catching up with Europe socially and developmentally in the late 19th century, military spending declined as funding was diverted to civilian spending, paying off foreign loans, and building infrastructure. Aside from major conflicts such as the Russo-Turkish War in the 1870s, as well as the Boxer Revolt in China at the turn of the century, the Russian army spent most of the two decades following the ascension of Alexander III quashing around 1,500 protests as antagonism towards the Tsarist model grew, crushing morale. When Russia went to war with Japan in 1904, it suffered a humiliating defeat, with Japan forcing Russia's Pacific Fleet to stay in anchor, prompting the Baltic Fleet to sail all around the Cape of Good Hope to the Pacific, only to be nearly wiped out at the Battle of Tsushima. As the First Russian Revolution gripped the country in response, many in the military began to mutiny, which helped prompt the October Manifesto. Even afterwards, between fall 1905 and summer 1906, there were around four hundred mutinies in the Russian army.

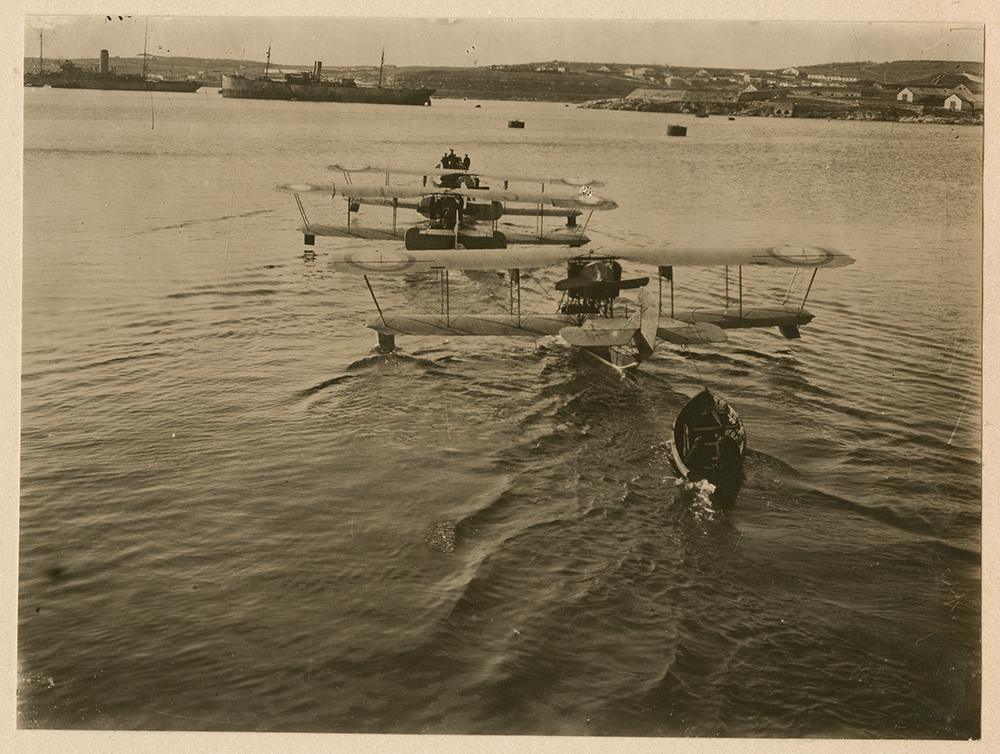
Grigorovich M-9s towing boats off the coast of Sevastopol

In 1914, Russia entered into World War I. Tsar Nicholas II appointed his cousin, Grand Duke Nicholas, as commander-in-chief. Russia entered the war with the largest army in Europe, and its military might even provoked Germany into war, who believed that they would have no chance to defeat them after 1916. In spite of this, Russia fared poorly in the war, and the Eastern Front saw massive losses for them and their allies. The army had severe tactical and operational issues when compared to the German Army (though it fared better against those of the other Central Powers), and the Russo-Japanese War had resulted in the Russian Navy slipping from being the third largest to sixth, with a rebuilding campaign being incomplete at the time of the July Crisis. In 1912, the same year the naval reconstitution started, the Imperial Russian Air Service was set up, and it saw limited action in the war. Eventually, the military defeats and poor conditions at the home front promulgated the Second Russian Revolution in 1917. Following the ousting of the Tsar in March in part to mutinies from troops who were tired of firing on protestors, the new Provisional Government began referring to the Imperial Russian Army as the Revolutionary Army of Free Russia, and this would continue shortly after the Russian Republic was declared. After the Bolshevik Revolution in November, the entire Russian military fell into disarray, as forces were split between White, Red, and neutral factions, and management became unwieldy. Foreign powers often seized their equipment or attacked them; the White commander Pyotr Wrangel and around 150 thousand of his men were forced to evacuate Crimea after the collapse of the White South Russia regime in 1920, taking the remnants of the Baltic Fleet to French control; they remained docked in French Tunisia until France recognized the USSR in 1924. In general, the Reds, as the eventual victors of the Russian Civil War, would take up most of the remnants of the Tsarist military, transforming them into the Soviet military.

== History and service ==
=== Crimean War ===
See main article on Crimean War

=== Russo-Turkish War, 1877–1878 ===
See main article on Russo-Turkish War (1877–1878)

=== Russo-Japanese War ===
See main article on Russo-Japanese War

The war between Russia and the Japanese Empire broke out on February 8, 1904 with a Japanese attack upon the Russian Far East Fleet stationed at Port Arthur. Plagued with logistical problems, outdated military equipment and incompetent Russian officers, Russian forces suffered numerous defeats in the course of the war, which ended in September 1905, in the aftermath of the destruction of the Russian fleet at the Battle of Tsushima. Faced with growing internal problems, including the Russian Revolution of 1905, Russia sued for peace as the war concluded with the Treaty of Portsmouth.

=== World War I ===
See main article on World War I, also see Eastern Front (World War I) and Caucasus Campaign

=== Russian Revolution of 1917 ===
See main article on Russian Revolution of 1917

== See also ==
- Foreign policy of the Russian Empire
- Imperial Russian Army
- Russian Army order of battle (1812)

== Citations ==
=== Bibliography ===
- Nicholas V. Riasanovsky and Mark D. Steinberg (2011). A History of Russia (8th ed.). Oxford University Press. ISBN 978-0-19-534197-3.
- David R. Stone (2006). A Military History of Russia: From Ivan the Terrible to the War in Chechnya. Praeger Security International. ISBN 0-275-98502-4.
- G. W. Prothero and Ernest Alfred Benians (1909). The Cambridge Modern History. Vol. 6. Cambridge University Press.
- Jessie D. Clarkson (1961). A History of Russia. Random House.
- R. G. Grant (2008). Battle at Sea: 3,000 Years of Naval Warfare. Dorling Kindersley Limited. ISBN 978-0-7566-3973-0.
- Robert Cowley and Geoffrey Parker, ed. (2001). The Reader's Companion to Military History. Houghton Mifflin Company. ISBN 0-395-66969-3.
- Lindsey Hughes (2004). Peter the Great: A Biography. Yale University Press. ISBN 978-0-300-10300-7.
- Robert I. Frost (2000). The Northern Wars: War, State and Society in Northeastern Europe 1558–1721. Longman. ISBN 0-582-06429-5.
- Angus Konstam (1994). Poltava 1709: Russia Comes of Age. Essential Histories. Osprey Publishing. ISBN 978-1-85532-416-9.
- Daniel Marston (2001). The Seven Years' War. Essential Histories. Osprey Publishing. ISBN 978-1-84176-191-6.

=== Further reading ===
- Cate, Curtis. The War of the Two Emperors: The Duel Between Napoleon and Alexander: Russia, 1812 (1985).
- Fuller, William C. Strategy and Power in Russia 1600–1914 (1998)
- Haythornthwaite, Philip J. The Russian Army of the Napoleonic Wars (1987) vol 1: Infantry 1799–1814; vol 2: Cavalry, 1799–1814
- Lieven, D. C. "Russia and the Defeat of Napoleon (1812–14)," Kritika: Explorations in Russian and Eurasian History (2006) 7#2 pp 283–308.
- William Reger, David Jones (ed.). The Military Encyclopedia of Russia and Eurasia. Academic International Press.
- John L. Keep (1985). Soldiers of the Tsar—Army and Society in Russia 1462–1874. Oxford University Press. ISBN 978-0-19-822575-1.
- Reforming the Tsar's Army: Military Innovation in Imperial Russia from Peter the Great to the Revolution. Cambridge University Press. 2004. ISBN 978-0-521-81988-6.
- Christopher Duffy (1982). Russia's Military Way to the West: Origins and Nature of Russian Military Power, 1700–1800. Routledge. ISBN 978-0-7100-0797-1.
- Robert K. Massie (1986). Peter the Great: His Life and World. Ballantine Books. ISBN 978-0-345-33619-4.
- Peter Englund (2002). The Battle That Shook Europe: Poltava and the Birth of the Russian Empire. I. B. Tauris. ISBN 978-1-86064-847-2.
- W. E. D. Allen and Paul Muratoff (1953). Caucasian Battlefield. Cambridge University Press.
- Paul Britten Austin (1993). 1812: The March on Moscow. Greenwood Press. ISBN 978-1-85367-154-8.
