= Third Silesian War =

1756–63 conflict between Prussia and Austria

- Part of the Seven Years' War and the Silesian Wars
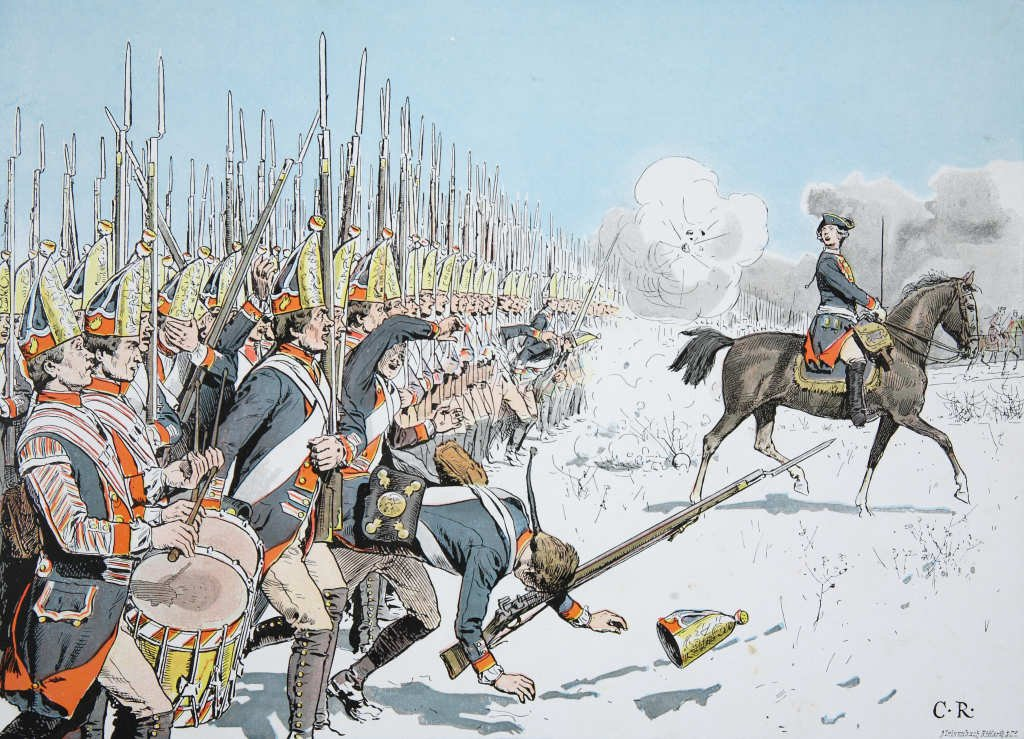
- Prussian grenadiers advancing at the Battle of Leuthen
Date	29 August 1756 – 15 February 1763
Location	Central Europe
Result	Prussian victory

Belligerents
Prussia	Habsburg monarchy; Saxony; Russia (until 1762); France (until 1758)

Commanders and leaders
(Kingdom of Prussia) Frederick II (WIA); (Kingdom of Prussia) Hans Lehwaldt; (Kingdom of Prussia) Kurt Schwerin †; (Kingdom of Prussia) Hans Winterfeldt (DOW); (Kingdom of Prussia) Augustus William (POW); (Kingdom of Prussia) James Keith †; (Kingdom of Prussia) Henry Ludwig; (Kingdom of Prussia) Friedrich Seydlitz; (Kingdom of Prussia) Frederick Eugene; (Kingdom of Prussia) Johann Hülsen; (Kingdom of Prussia) Hans Zieten; (Kingdom of Prussia) Prince Henry of Prussia; (Kingdom of Prussia) Carl Wedel; (Kingdom of Prussia) Moritz Wobersnow †; (Kingdom of Prussia) Heinrich Manteuffel (WIA); (Kingdom of Prussia) Heinrich Fouqué (WIA) (POW); (Kingdom of Prussia) Friedrich Finck (surrendered); (Kingdom of Prussia) Johann Wunsch; (Kingdom of Prussia) Heinrich Heyde; (Kingdom of Prussia) Paul Werner; (Kingdom of Prussia) Dubislav Platen; (Kingdom of Prussia) Friedrich Tauentzien	(Habsburg monarchy) Maria Theresa; (Habsburg monarchy) Maximilian Browne (DOW); (Habsburg monarchy) Charles Alexander; (Habsburg monarchy) Joseph Daun (WIA); (Habsburg monarchy) Ernst Laudon; (Habsburg monarchy) Franz Lacy; (Habsburg monarchy) András Hadik; (Habsburg monarchy) Frederick Charles; (Habsburg monarchy) Franz Nádasdy; (Habsburg monarchy) Johann Ostein; (Habsburg monarchy) Christian Rothenfels; (Habsburg monarchy) Joseph Wilhelm; (Habsburg monarchy) Frederick Michael; (Habsburg monarchy) Soloman Bernegg #; (Habsburg monarchy) John Maguire; (Electorate of Saxony) Frederick Augustus II; (Electorate of Saxony) Frederick Rutowsky; (Russian Empire) Empress Elizabeth; (Russian Empire) Stepan Apraksin #; (Russian Empire) William Fermor; (Russian Empire) Pyotr Saltykov; (Russian Empire) Zakhar Chernyshev; (Russian Empire) Gottlob Totleben; (Russian Empire) Pyotr Rumyantsev; (Russian Empire) Ivan Sakomelsky; (Russian Empire) Alexander Suvorov; (Kingdom of France) Louis XV; (Kingdom of France) Charles Rohan

Strength
(Kingdom of Prussia) 250,000	(Habsburg monarchy) 450,000 (Electorate of Saxony) 17,000 (Russian Empire) 331,000 (Kingdom of France) 30,200 ca

Casualties and losses
(Kingdom of Prussia) 180,000 dead	(Habsburg monarchy) Over 145,000 dead or missing

The Third Silesian War (German: Dritter Schlesischer Krieg) was a war between Prussia and Austria (together with its allies) that lasted from 1756 to 1763 and confirmed Prussia's control of the region of Silesia (now in south-western Poland). The war was fought mainly in Silesia, Bohemia and Upper Saxony and formed one theatre of the Seven Years' War. It was the last of three Silesian Wars fought between Frederick the Great's Prussia and Maria Theresa's Austria in the mid-18th century, all three of which ended in Prussian control of Silesia.

This conflict can be viewed as a continuation of the First and Second Silesian Wars of the previous decade. After the Treaty of Aix-la-Chapelle ended the War of the Austrian Succession, Austria enacted broad reforms and upended its traditional diplomatic policy to prepare for renewed war with Prussia. As with the previous Silesian Wars, no particular triggering event initiated the conflict; rather, Prussia struck opportunistically to disrupt its enemies' plans. The war's cost in blood and treasure was high on both sides, and it ended inconclusively when neither of the main belligerents could sustain the conflict any longer.

The war began with a Prussian invasion of Saxony in mid-1756, and it ended in a Prussian diplomatic victory with the 1763 Treaty of Hubertusburg, which confirmed Prussian control of Silesia. The treaty resulted in no territorial changes, but Austria agreed to recognise Prussia's sovereignty in Silesia in return for Prussia's support for the election of Maria Theresa's son, Archduke Joseph, as Holy Roman Emperor. The conflict formed part of the ongoing Austria–Prussia rivalry that would shape German politics for more than a century. The war greatly enhanced the prestige of Prussia, which won general recognition as a major European power, and of Frederick, who cemented his reputation as a preeminent military commander.

== Context and causes ==
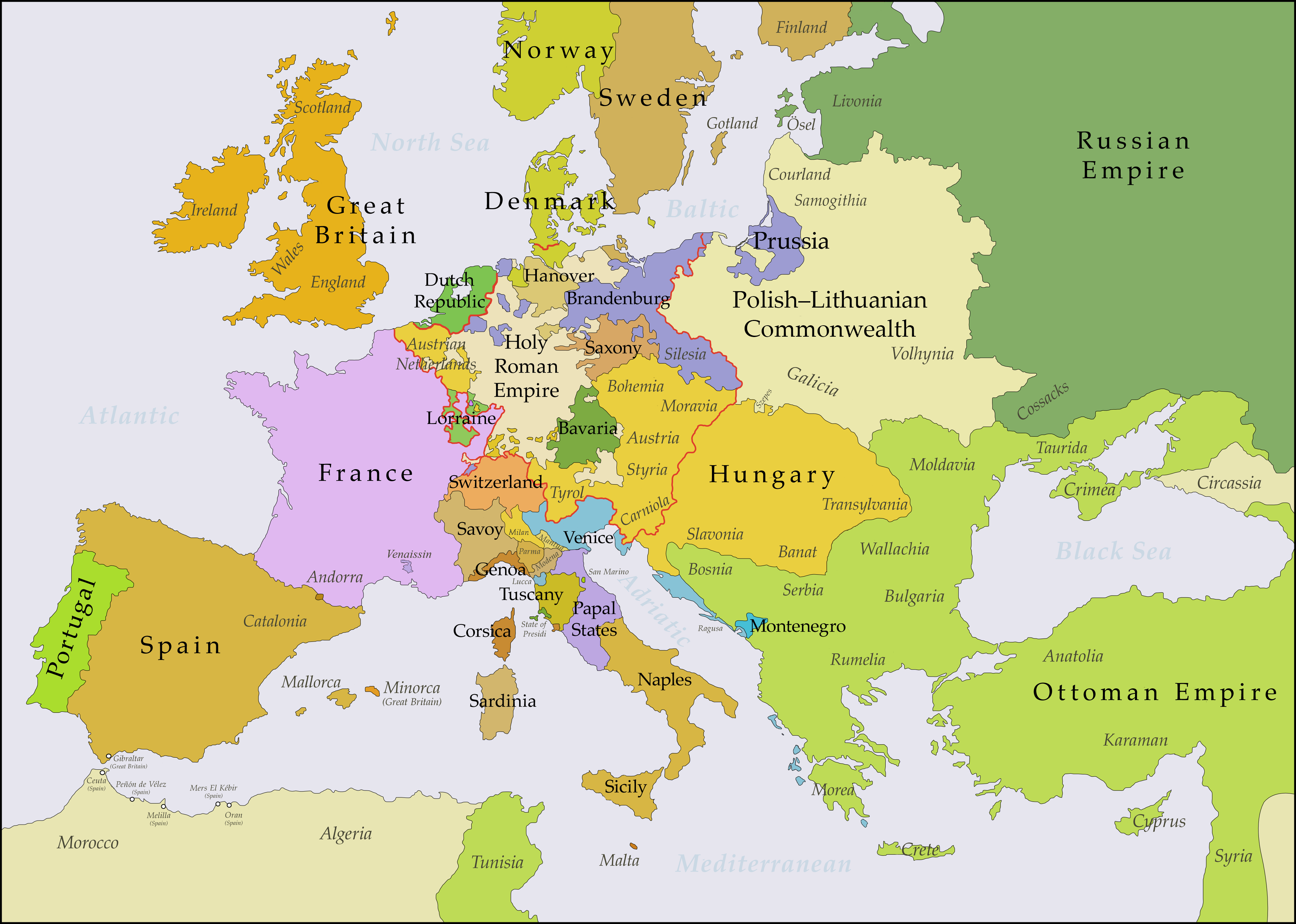
Europe in the years after the Treaty of Aix-la-Chapelle (1748), with Brandenburg–Prussia in violet and the Habsburg monarchy in gold

While the Seven Years' War was a global conflict among many belligerents, its Central European theatre turned on lingering grudges from the War of the Austrian Succession (1741–1748). The Treaty of Aix-la-Chapelle, which had concluded the latter war, confirmed Prussian King Frederick II's seizure of the region of Silesia from the Habsburg monarchy through two Silesian Wars. The defeated Empress Maria Theresa of Austria nevertheless fully intended to retake the lost province and reassert Austria's hegemony in the Holy Roman Empire; after peace was restored, she set about rebuilding her armed forces and seeking out new alliances.

=== Unresolved conflicts ===
Though France and Great Britain recognised Prussia's sovereignty in Silesia under the Treaty of Aix-la-Chapelle, Austria ultimately refused to ratify the agreement, and Maria Theresa's husband Francis I, Holy Roman Emperor, withheld the Holy Roman Empire's guarantee for Prussian control of the contested province. Prussia, in turn, withheld its assent to the Pragmatic Sanction, thus challenging Maria Theresa's legitimacy as head of the Habsburg monarchy. Despite dynastic links, British King George II viewed Prussia as an ally and proxy of the French, while Empress Elizabeth of Russia saw Frederick's kingdom as a rival for influence in the Polish–Lithuanian Commonwealth and feared that Prussia's growing power would obstruct the path of Russia's westward expansion. The political and diplomatic conditions that had led to the previous Silesian Wars still held, and further conflict seemed likely.

In 1746 Maria Theresa formed a defensive agreement with Elizabeth known as the Treaty of Two Empresses, which aligned Austria and Russia against Prussia; a secret clause guaranteed Russia's support for Austria's claims in Silesia. In 1750 Britain joined the anti-Prussian compact in return for guarantees of Austrian and Russian support in the case of a Prussian attack on the Electorate of Hanover, which George also ruled in personal union. At the same time, Maria Theresa, who had been disappointed with Britain's performance as her ally in the War of the Austrian Succession, followed the controversial advice of her Chancellor Wenzel Anton von Kaunitz by pursuing warmer relations with Austria's longstanding rival, the Kingdom of France.

=== Diplomatic Revolution ===
Britain elevated tensions in 1755 by offering to finance the deployment of a Russian army that would stand ready to attack Prussia's eastern frontier. Alarmed by this encirclement, Frederick began working to separate Britain from the Austrian coalition by allaying King George's concern for Hanover. On 16 January 1756 Prussia and Britain agreed to the Convention of Westminster, under which Prussia now undertook to guarantee Hanover against French attack, in return for Britain's withdrawal of its offer of military subsidies to Russia. This move created a new Anglo-Prussian alliance and incensed the French court.

Austria was now seeking warmer relations with France to ensure that the French would not take Prussia's side in a future conflict over Silesia. King Louis XV responded to Prussia's realignment with Britain by accepting Maria Theresa's invitation to a new Franco-Austrian alliance, formalised with the First Treaty of Versailles in May 1756. This series of political manoeuvres came to be known as the Diplomatic Revolution. Russia, likewise upset by the withdrawal of Britain's promised subsidies, drew closer to Austria and France, agreeing to a more openly offensive anti-Prussian coalition in April 1756. As France turned against Prussia and Russia separated from Britain, Kaunitz's plan thus matured into a grand anti-Prussian alliance between Austria, Russia, various lesser German powers, and France.

=== Preparations for war ===
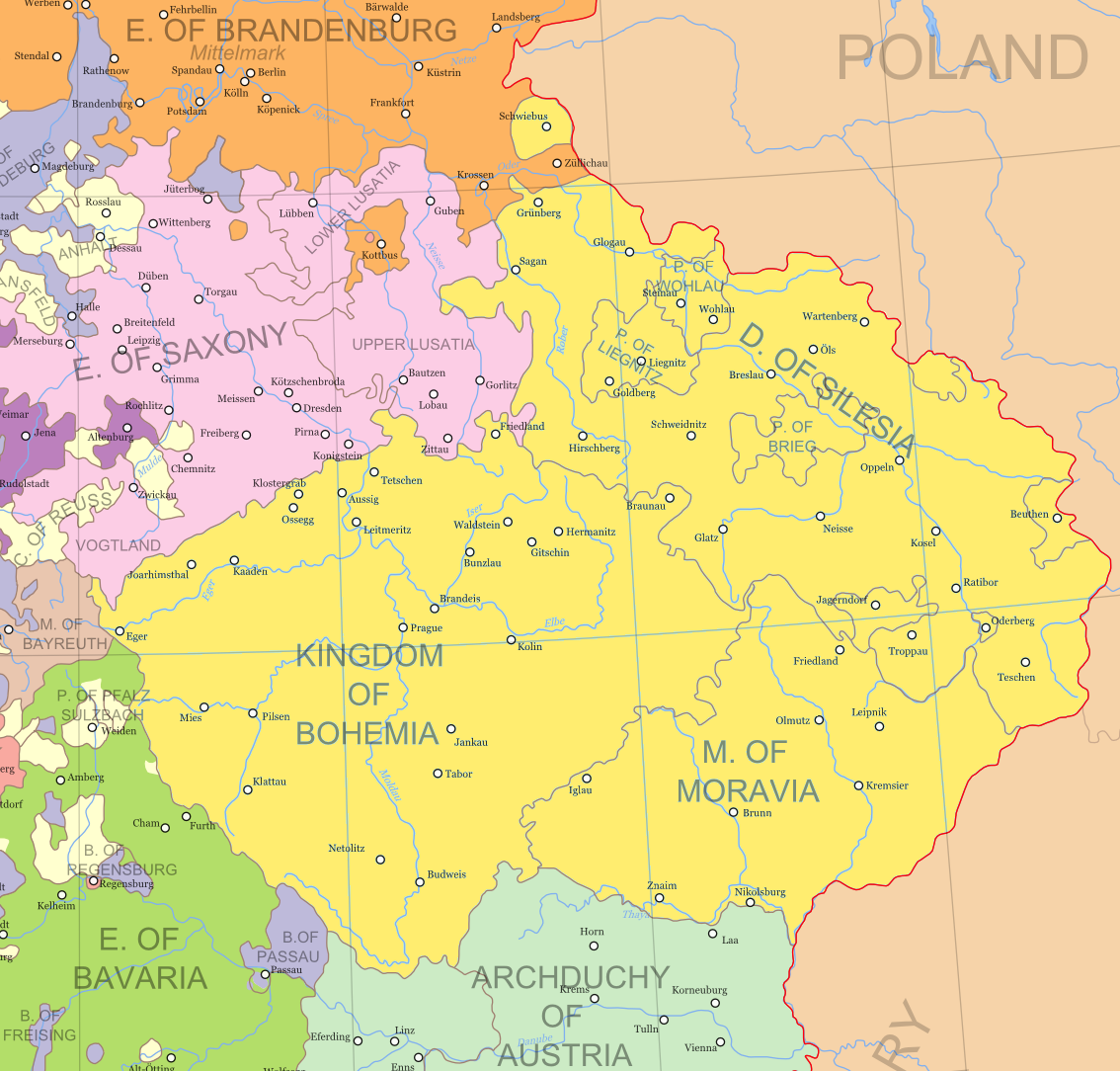
Map of the Central European region, prior to Prussia's seizure of Silesia, where the bulk of the war was fought

As Austria and Russia made open preparations for renewed war, Frederick became convinced that Prussia would be attacked in early 1757. Rather than wait for his enemies to move at a time of their choosing, he resolved instead to act preemptively, beginning with an attack against the neighbouring Electorate of Saxony, which he correctly believed was a secret party to the coalition against him. Frederick's broad strategy had three parts. First, he meant to occupy Saxony, gaining strategic depth and using the Saxon army and treasury to bolster the Prussian war effort. Second, he would advance from Saxony into Bohemia, where he might set up winter quarters and supply his army at Austria's expense. Third, he would invade Moravia from Silesia, seize the fortress at Olmütz, and advance on Vienna to force an end to the war. He hoped to receive financial support from the British, who had also promised to send a naval squadron into the Baltic Sea to defend Prussia's coast against Russia, if necessary.

To begin, Frederick divided Prussia's armies in three. He placed a force of 20,000 under Field Marshal Hans von Lehwaldt in East Prussia to guard against any Russian invasion from the east, with a reserve of 8,000 standing in Farther Pomerania; Russia should have been able to bring irresistible force to bear against East Prussia, but the King trusted to the slowness and disorganisation of the Imperial Russian Army to defend his north-eastern flank. He also stationed Field Marshal Count Kurt von Schwerin in Silesia with 25,000 men to deter incursions from Moravia and Hungary. Finally, in August 1756 he personally led the main Prussian army of around 60,000 into Saxony, beginning the Third Silesian War.

=== Methods and technologies ===
European warfare in the early modern period was characterised by the widespread adoption of firearms in combination with more traditional bladed weapons. Eighteenth-century European armies were built around units of massed infantry armed with smoothbore flintlock muskets and bayonets. Cavalrymen were equipped with sabres and pistols or carbines; light cavalry were used principally for reconnaissance, screening and tactical communications, while heavy cavalry were used as tactical reserves and deployed for shock attacks. Smoothbore artillery provided fire support and played the leading role in siege warfare. Strategic warfare in this period centred around control of key fortifications positioned so as to command the surrounding regions and roads, with lengthy sieges a common feature of armed conflict. Decisive field battles were relatively rare, though they played a larger part in Frederick's theory of warfare than was typical among his contemporary rivals.

The Silesian Wars, like most European wars of the 18th century, were fought as so-called cabinet wars in which disciplined regular armies were equipped and supplied by the state to conduct warfare on behalf of the sovereign's interests. Occupied enemy territories were regularly taxed and extorted for funds, but large-scale atrocities against civilian populations were rare compared with conflicts in the previous century. Military logistics was the decisive factor in many wars, as armies had grown too large to support themselves on prolonged campaigns by foraging and plunder alone. Military supplies were stored in centralised magazines and distributed by baggage trains that were highly vulnerable to enemy raids. Armies were generally unable to sustain combat operations during winter and normally established winter quarters in the cold season, resuming their campaigns with the return of spring.

== Course ==
=== 1756 ===
==== Invasion of Saxony ====
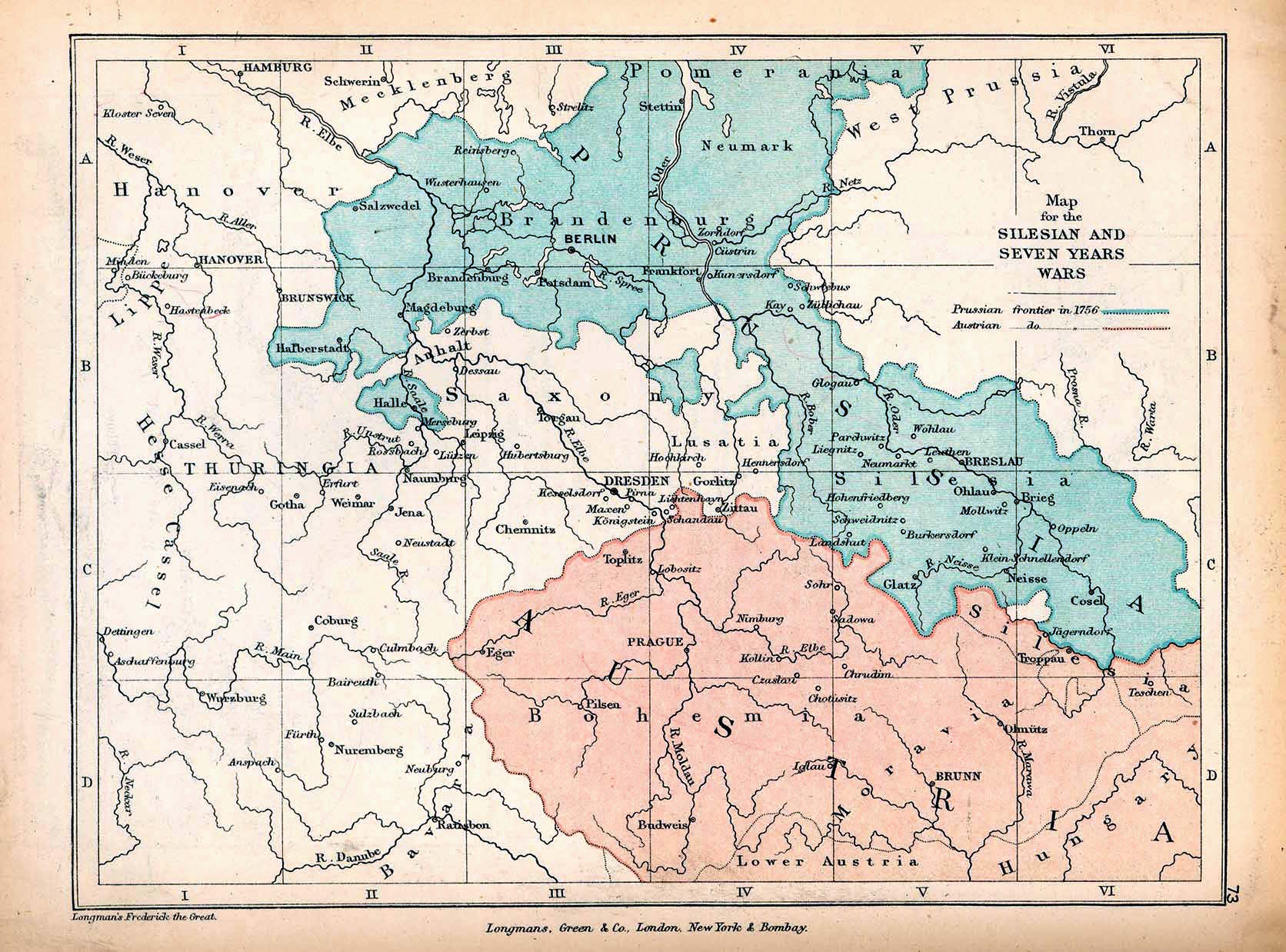
The Central European borders of Brandenburg–Prussia (blue-green) and the Habsburg monarchy (red) in 1756, at the outbreak of the Third Silesian War

Prussian troops crossed the Saxon frontier on 29 August 1756. The Prussian Army marched in three columns: on the right were about 15,000 men under the command of Prince Ferdinand of Brunswick; on the left were 18,000 men under the command of the Duke of Brunswick-Bevern; in the centre was Frederick himself, with Field Marshal James Keith commanding a corps of 30,000 troops. Prince Ferdinand was to advance on the town of Chemnitz and proceed to Leipzig, while Bevern was to traverse Lusatia to seize Bautzen. Meanwhile, Frederick and Keith would advance through Torgau to attack the Saxon capital at Dresden. Saxony and Austria were unprepared for Frederick's preemptive strike, and their forces were scattered; as Prussians streamed into the Electorate, the main Saxon army fortified itself at Pirna, and the Prussians occupied Dresden on 9 September against little resistance.

Frederick and the main Prussian army pressed on into northern Bohemia, looking to engage the Austrians under General Maximilian Ulysses Browne before they could join forces with the Saxons. Browne took up a defensible position by the village of Lobositz, where the two forces fought the Battle of Lobositz on 1 October. The engagement ended inconclusively, with the Austrians inflicting significant losses on the Prussians and then retreating in good order; Frederick thus prevented Browne from reinforcing the isolated Saxons, but Browne stopped Frederick's advance into Bohemia. Turning back to the north, the Prussians fully occupied Saxony, even taking Elector Frederick Augustus II of Saxony prisoner, although he was allowed to withdraw to Poland on 18 October. The Saxon army was briefly besieged at Pirna and surrendered on 14 October, after which its men were forcibly incorporated into the Prussian army under Prussian officers. Saxony's treasury was emptied and its currency debased to help fund the Prussian war effort.

=== 1757 ===
==== Winter diplomacy ====
Over the winter of 1756–1757 the belligerents worked to secure their respective alliances and coordinate strategy with their allies. In February William Pitt, the new Leader of the House of Commons and a determined foe of France, persuaded the British Parliament to firmly and finally commit to the Prussian cause against Austria and France, after which Britain began delivering supplies and badly needed subsidies to Berlin. Parliament also approved the deployment of an Army of Observation to defend Hanover (and Brandenburg) against the coming French invasion from the west, and Frederick again called for a British naval deployment in the Baltic to deter Russia and an increasingly unfriendly Sweden, though nothing came of it.

However, Prussia's aggressive attack on Saxony galvanised the Austrian coalition, and in particular increased France's commitment to offensive war against Prussia. The Imperial Diet met in January in Regensburg, where Maria Theresa won enough German princes to her cause that the Holy Roman Empire declared war on Prussia on 17 January; the Diet called for a 40,000-man Reichsarmee to be assembled and put at Austria's disposal for the liberation of Saxony. In May 1757 the Second Treaty of Versailles strengthened the Franco-Austrian Alliance, with the French agreeing to contribute 129,000 soldiers to the fighting in Germany, along with subsidies of 12 million livres per year until Austria had recovered Silesia.

In return, Austria promised that after the victory was won it would grant France control of the Austrian Netherlands, a long-coveted prize for the French. Russia also committed 80,000 men to the conflict, hoping to seize East Prussia and then exchange that territory with Poland for control of Courland. Sweden also agreed to invade Prussian Pomerania, looking to recovering the territories lost to Prussia after the Great Northern War. In all, then, the Austrian coalition sought a total partition of the Kingdom of Prussia, all while portraying Frederick as the aggressor for making the first move to open war.

==== Bohemian campaign and Battle of Kolín ====
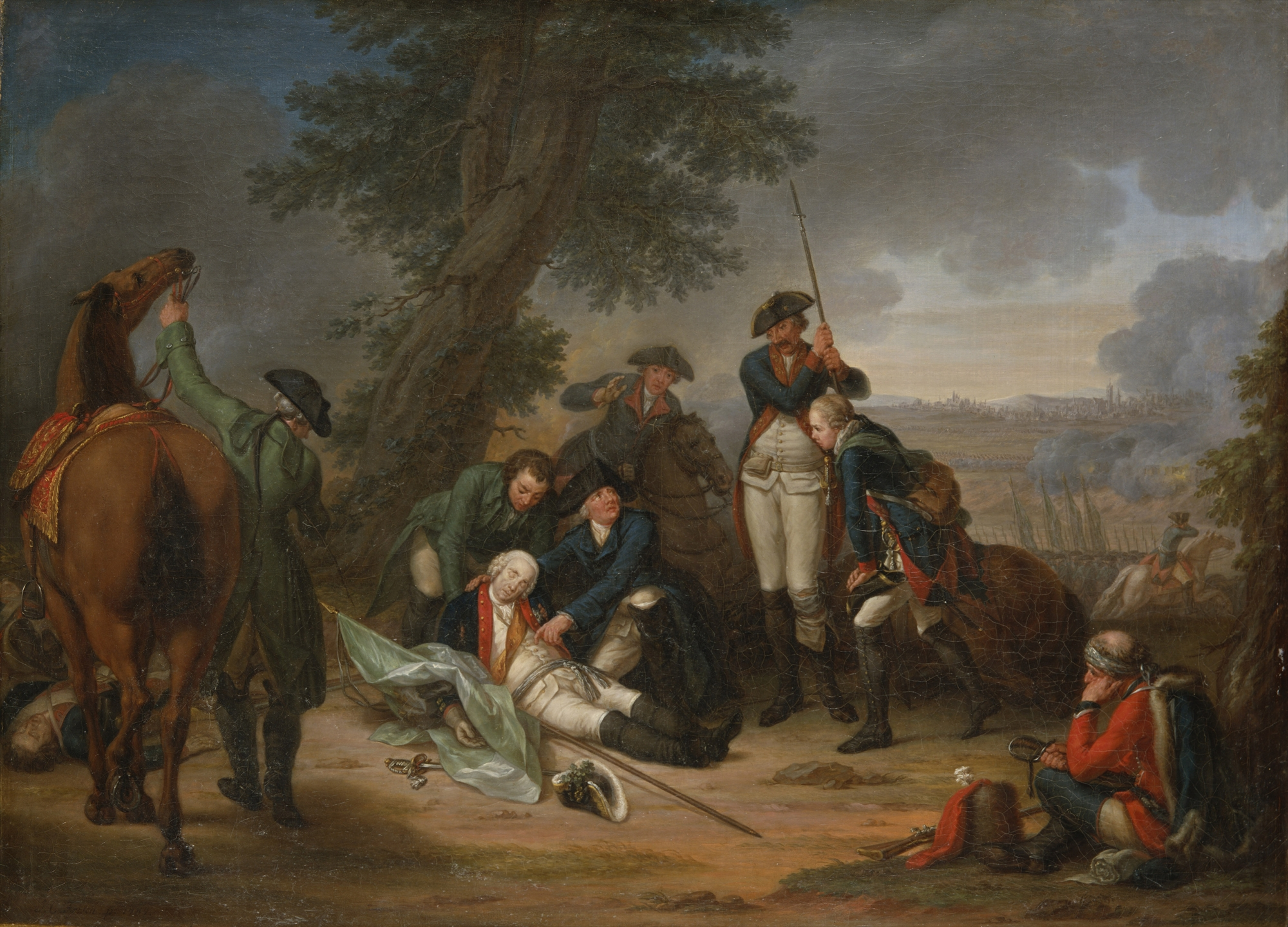
Prussian Field Marshal Kurt von Schwerin dying of wounds at the Battle of Prague, as depicted by Johann Christoph Frisch

After wintering in Saxony, Frederick decided to immediately invade Bohemia again, before French or Russian forces could reach the area and support the Austrians. On 18 April 1757 the main Prussian army advanced in multiple columns through the Ore Mountains, seeking a decisive engagement with Browne's forces, while the Silesian garrison under Schwerin advanced from Glatz to join them. On 21 April Bevern's column encountered an Austrian corps led by Count Königsegg near Reichenberg; the ensuing Battle of Reichenberg ended in a Prussian victory, and the Prussian forces continued to advance on Prague.

The invading columns reunited north of Prague, while the retreating Austrians reformed under the command of Prince Charles of Lorraine to the city's east, and on 6 May the two armies fought the Battle of Prague. Both sides suffered heavy casualties, and both Browne and Schwerin were killed, but the Prussians forced the Austrians back into the fortified city, which the invaders then besieged. Learning of the attack on Prague, Austrian commander Count Leopold von Daun advanced from the east with a force of 30,000 men. Daun arrived too late to join the Battle of Prague, but he collected thousands of scattered Austrians who had escaped from the battle; with these reinforcements he slowly moved to relieve the city.

Trying to simultaneously besiege Prague and face Daun, the Prussians were compelled to divide their forces. Frederick led 5,000 troops from the siege to reinforce a 19,000-man army under Bevern at nearby Kolín and assess the situation. Without sufficient force to resist Daun's advance, Frederick decided to withdraw more men from the siege and preemptively attack the Austrian position. The resulting Battle of Kolín on 18 June ended in a decisive Austrian victory; the Prussian position was ruined, and the invaders were forced to lift the siege and withdraw from Bohemia altogether, pursued by Daun's army, which was enlarged by the Prague garrison. The failure to take Bohemia meant the ruin of Frederick's strategy, leaving no prospect of a march on Vienna.

==== East Prussia and Pomerania ====
Prussia's reversal in Bohemia paralleled the entry of new belligerents on the Austrian side. In mid-1757 a Russian force of 75,000 troops under Field Marshal Stepan Fyodorovich Apraksin invaded East Prussia and took the fortress at Memel. Advancing further, the Russians engaged and defeated a smaller Prussian force led by Lehwaldt in the Battle of Gross-Jägersdorf on 30 August. However, the victorious Russians were unable to take Königsberg, having expended their supplies at Memel and Gross-Jägersdorf, and retreated soon afterwards; recurring difficulties with logistics limited the offensive capabilities of the large Russian army and allowed East Prussia to hold out longer than might have been expected. Sweden, too, declared war on Prussia in September, invading Prussian Pomerania on 13 September with 17,000 men and beginning the Pomeranian War. The need to defend core territories on these fronts reduced Prussia's offensive capacity in Bohemia and Silesia.

==== Battle of Rossbach ====
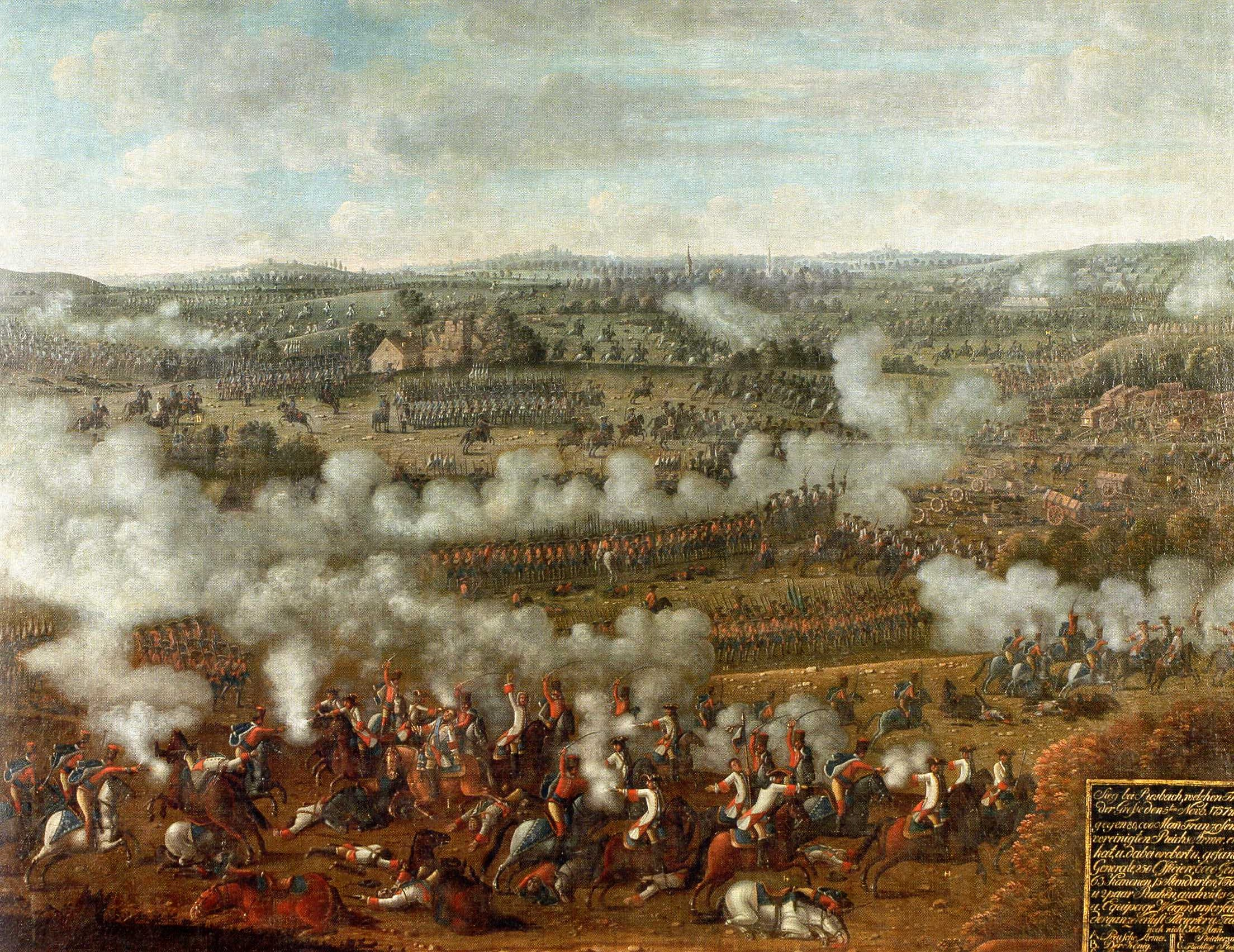
The Battle of Rossbach, where a portion of Prussia's army destroyed the united French and Imperial armies in a 90-minute battle

In mid-1757 Austrian forces gradually pushed into Prussian-controlled Lusatia, while a combined French and Reichsarmee force under the Prince of Soubise approached the theatre from the west. On 7 September the Austrians under Daun and Prince Charles, advancing into Upper Lusatia, defeated a Prussian force under Bevern and Hans Karl von Winterfeldt at the Battle of Moys, during which Winterfeldt was killed. Prince Charles's army then proceeded westward, hoping to link up with Soubise's force after the latter had traversed Saxony, while Bevern and his army retreated eastward to defend Lower Silesia.

Deterred by the overwhelming Austrian force in Lusatia, Frederick instead led a Prussian army westward into Thuringia to seek a decisive engagement with the approaching Franco-Imperial army before it could unite with Prince Charles and Daun. The Imperials evaded the Prussians, however, and on 10 September Hanover and the British army of observation surrendered to France with the Convention of Klosterzeven, further exposing Prussia's western flank. Meanwhile, between 10 and 17 October a small hussar force under Hungarian Count András Hadik ranged ahead of the main Austrian force to briefly occupy Berlin, ransoming the city for 200,000 thalers and then retreating. In late October the Prussian army reversed course and moved back eastward to Leipzig to defend Prussia's core territory against the various threats it now faced.

After this series of manoeuvres, on 5 November a Prussian corps under Frederick located and engaged Soubise's much larger force near the village of Rossbach in Saxony. The ensuing Battle of Rossbach ended in a stunning Prussian victory, in which Frederick lost fewer than 1,000 men, while the Franco-German force under Soubise lost around 10,000. This victory secured Prussia's control of Saxony for a time, and its effect on the morale of both sides was dramatic. After the embarrassing defeat at Rossbach, French interest in the Silesian War declined sharply, and French forces were soon withdrawn from the Silesian theatre, leaving Rossbach as the only battle between the French and Prussians during the war.

==== Battle of Leuthen ====
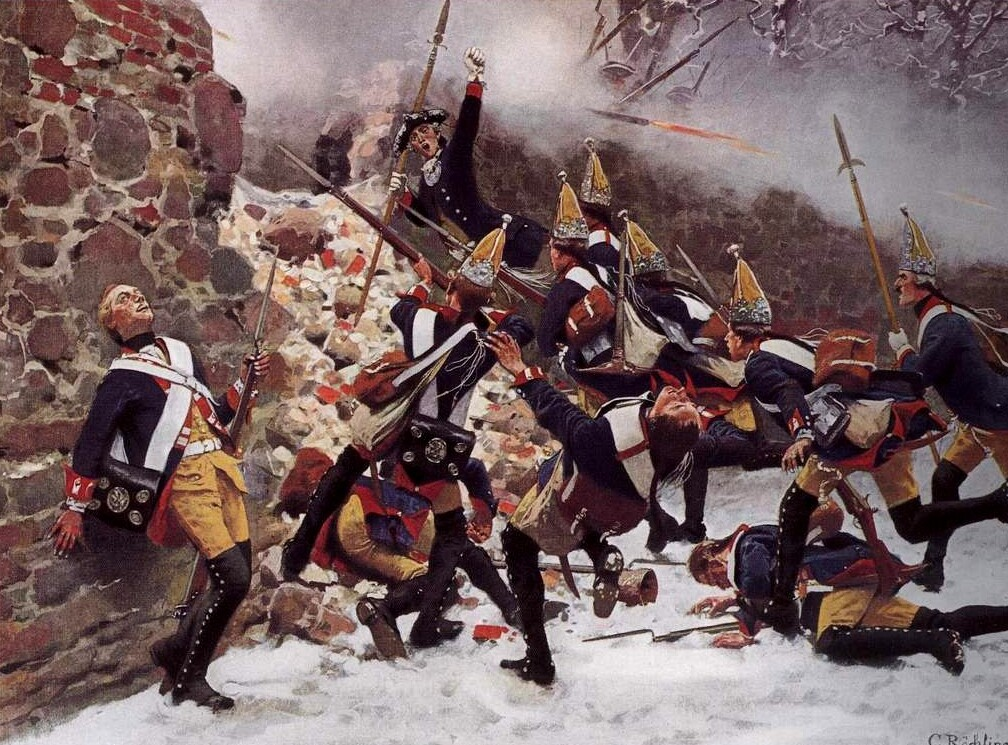
Prussian grenadiers storming the parish church during the Battle of Leuthen, as depicted by Carl Röchling

While Frederick's army manoeuvred in western Saxony and Thuringia, the Austrian army of Prince Charles and Daun pressed eastward into Lower Silesia. In November they reached Breslau, where they were opposed by the Silesian garrison under Bevern. The Austrians had overwhelming numbers, and in the Battle of Breslau on 22 November they drove the Prussians from the field. Bevern himself was taken prisoner, and the bulk of his remaining forces retreated toward Glogau, leaving behind some thousands to garrison the city against a siege; the commander of the garrison surrendered Breslau to the Austrians on 25 November in return for safe passage.

When Frederick learned of the fall of Breslau, his 22,000 men marched 274 kilometres (170 mi) in twelve days to regroup with the retreating Prussian troops from Breslau at Liegnitz. The augmented army of about 33,000 men arrived near Leuthen, 27 kilometres (17 mi) west of Breslau, to find 66,000 Austrians in formation around the village. Despite his troops' fatigue from the rapid march, Frederick engaged the superior Austrian force on 5 December and won another unexpected victory in the Battle of Leuthen. The Prussians pursued Prince Charles's defeated army all the way back to Bohemia, while the Austrian and French forces still within Breslau were besieged until their surrender on 19–20 December, bringing the bulk of Silesia back under Prussian control.

==== Winter manoeuvres ====
After this major defeat, Prince Charles was removed from his command and replaced by Daun, who was now promoted to Field Marshal. Frederick hoped the major victories at Rossbach and Leuthen would bring Maria Theresa to the peace table, but she was determined not to negotiate until she had retaken Silesia. Prussia had already exhausted its treasury in the 1757 campaign, and it now devalued its currency while imposing fresh taxes on occupied Saxony and on the Catholic Church in Silesia to raise funds for the new year. With the Saxon–Silesian front stabilised, Frederick ordered the bulk of his East Prussian forces under Lehwaldt to reinforce Pomerania, predicting that no new Russian advance would come until after the winter. The enlarged Prussian army quickly drove the Swedes back, occupied most of Swedish Pomerania, and blockaded its capital at Stralsund through the winter. Prince Ferdinand, now made commander of the Hanoverian army, launched a series of winter offensives that ended the French occupation of Hanover and eventually drove the French out of Westphalia and across the Rhine, securing Prussia's western flank for the duration of the war.

=== 1758 ===
==== Moravian campaign ====
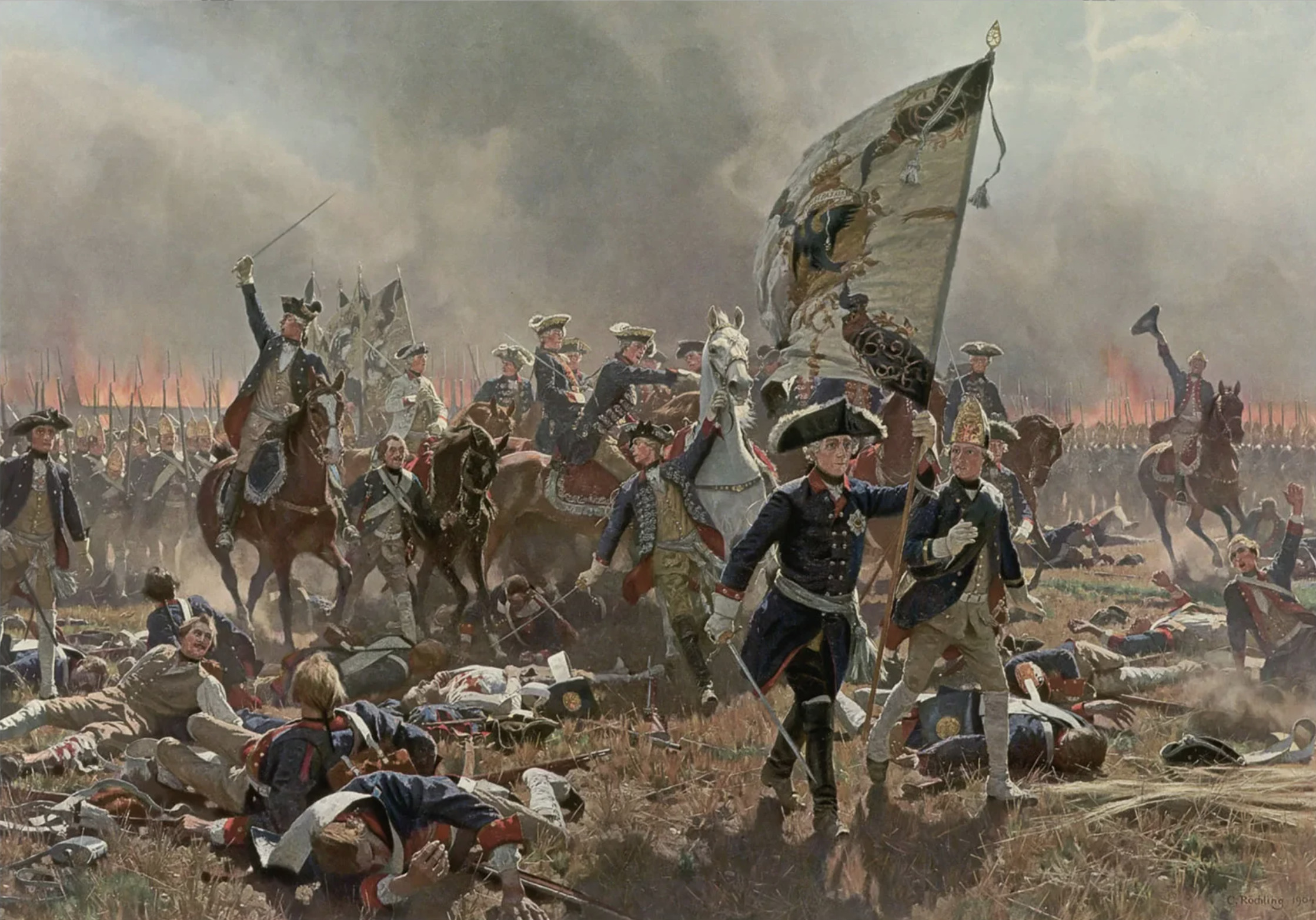
Frederick the Great leading the Prussians to a costly victory at the Battle of Zorndorf, as depicted by Carl Röchling

In January 1758 a Russian army commanded by Count William Fermor again invaded East Prussia, where the few remaining Prussian troops put up little resistance. Frederick abandoned the province to Russian occupation, judging it strategically expendable and preferring to concentrate on achieving another decisive victory in the Silesian theatre to force the Austrians to the peace table. In March France greatly reduced its financial and military commitments to the Austrian coalition with the signing of the Third Treaty of Versailles. As Prince Ferdinand's Prussian–Hanoverian army gradually forced the French out of northern Germany, Prussia and Britain quarrelled over the exact terms of their alliance, with Frederick demanding the commitment of British troops to Germany and the delivery of the long-promised naval squadron in the Baltic, while Pitt insisted on conserving Britain's resources for the wider global war.

At length, on 11 April the British formalised their alliance with Prussia in the Anglo-Prussian Convention, in which they committed to provide Prussia with a subsidy of £670,000 annually (equivalent to £104 million in 2025) and to make no separate peace, as well as deploying 9,000 troops to reinforce Prince Ferdinand's army in the Rhineland. Frederick decided that the time had come to invade Moravia and seize the fortified city of Olmütz, as he had planned the previous year, as soon as the last Austrians could be driven from Silesia. Schweidnitz, the last Austrian-occupied stronghold in Silesia, surrendered on 16 April, after which Frederick led a field army into Moravia, reaching Olmütz on 29 April and besieging it on 20 May.

Olmütz was well defended, and the siege was slow and difficult. Frederick hoped to provoke an Austrian counter-attack, but Daun chose to avoid direct engagements with the Prussian force, focusing instead on harassing its supply lines. By late June the city's defences were badly damaged, but the besieging army's supplies were acutely low. On 30 June Austrian forces commanded by General Ernst von Laudon intercepted a massive supply convoy from Silesia bound for the Prussian army at Olmütz and destroyed it in the Battle of Domstadtl. After this loss, the Prussians were forced to break off the siege and withdraw from Moravia, abandoning their final major invasion of Austrian territory during the war.

==== Battles of Zorndorf and Hochkirch ====
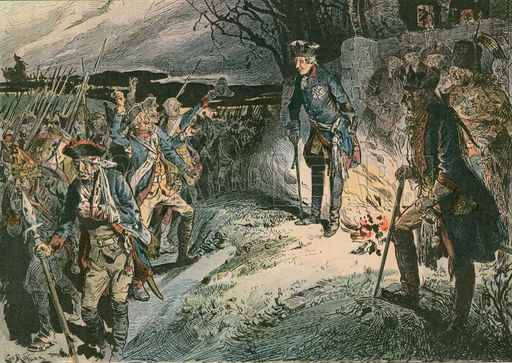
Wounded Prussians retreating after Austrian forces surprised and defeated the main Prussian army at the Battle of Hochkirch, as depicted by Carl Röchling

Frustrated in Moravia, the Prussians fortified Saxony and Silesia, while Frederick led an army northward to repel the advancing Russians, who had by then reached the borders of Brandenburg, where they besieged and burned Küstrin. The Prussian troops who had besieged Stralsund through the winter now withdrew to bolster Frederick's force, joining them near the ruins of Küstrin on 22 August. On 25 August a Prussian army of 35,000 men under Frederick engaged a Russian army of 43,000 under Fermor just east of the Oder in Neumark at the Battle of Zorndorf. Both sides fought to exhaustion and suffered heavy casualties, but the Russians withdrew, and Frederick claimed victory.

The Prussians regrouped and marched back to Saxony, where they manoeuvred against Daun's advancing Austrians through September and into October, probing the Austrians' communications but avoiding any decisive engagement. On 14 October Daun surprised the main Prussian army led by Frederick and Keith near Hochkirch in Lusatia, overwhelming them in the Battle of Hochkirch. The Prussians abandoned much of their artillery and supplies, and Keith was killed in action, but the survivors retreated in good order, and Daun declined to pursue them. The Prussians hastily regrouped and entered Silesia to break an Austrian siege of Neisse on 7 November. After this they returned westward to reinforce Dresden in case of an attack by Daun, but the Austrians withdrew to the west without further attacks.

==== Winter quarters ====
After taking heavy losses at Zorndorf, Fermor's Russian army pulled back to the Baltic coast and across the Vistula, making no further attacks against Prussia in 1758. The withdrawal of Prussian soldiers from Swedish Pomerania led to a renewed Swedish offensive in September, which progressed as far as Neuruppin; but, after failing to unite with either Russian or Austrian forces, the Swedes fell back to Swedish Pomerania for the winter for supplies. Despite their victory at Hochkirch, Daun's Austrians, too, ultimately made little strategic progress in Saxony and were unable to retake Dresden. Eventually, the Austrians were forced to withdraw into Bohemia for the winter, leaving Saxony under Prussian control, while the decimated Prussian army worked to rebuild itself in Saxony and Silesia.

=== 1759 ===
==== Battle of Kunersdorf ====
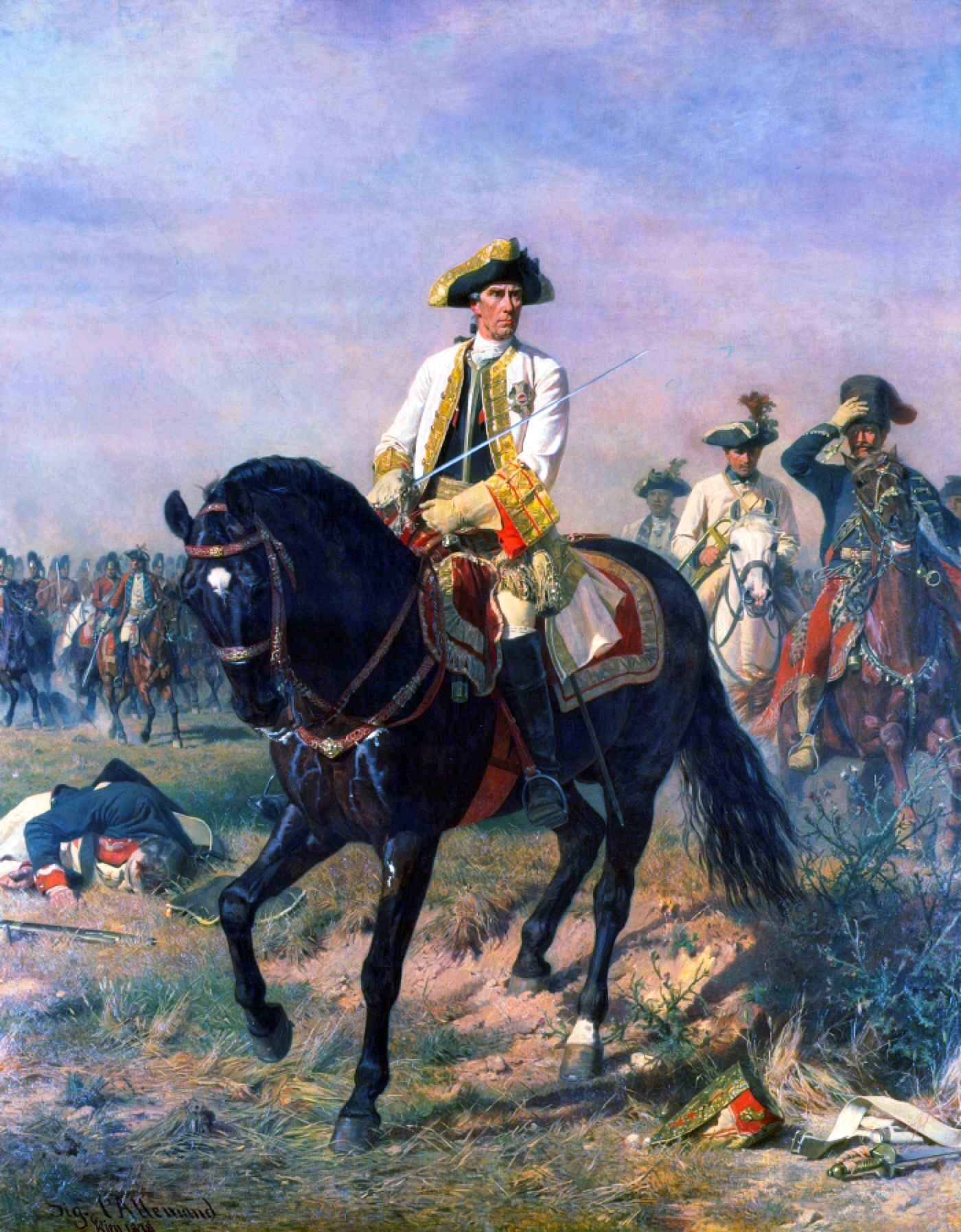
Austrian General Ernst von Laudon surveying the field at the Battle of Kunersdorf, where his army combined with Russian forces to defeat Frederick's Prussians, as depicted by Siegmund l'Allemand

In April 1759 Frederick led his main army from Saxony into Lower Silesia to keep the Russian army in western Poland separated from Daun's Austrians in Bohemia. Meanwhile, a smaller Prussian force under Frederick's younger brother, Prince Henry, remained in Saxony to harass Bohemia through the Ore Mountains, winning the Battle of Peterswalde and a series of other minor engagements, as well as destroying several Austrian ammunition dumps and bridges before retreating into Saxony. The Russians continued to press into Neumark; on 23 July the new Russian commander, Count Pyotr Saltykov, led 47,000 men in defeating 26,000 Prussians commanded by General Carl Heinrich von Wedel at the Battle of Kay. The Russians advanced westward toward the Oder, while Frederick led reinforcements northward to join Wedel and face Saltykov, leaving Prince Henry and General Heinrich August de la Motte Fouqué to see to the defence of Saxony and Silesia, respectively.

On 3 August Saltykov reached and occupied Frankfurt an der Oder, where he received significant Austrian reinforcements sent from Daun under Laudon's command. Determined to drive back the Russians, who were now within 80 kilometres (50 mi) of Berlin, Frederick joined with the survivors from the Battle of Kay and on 12 August attacked the Russian position around the village of Kunersdorf, east of Frankfurt. The resulting Battle of Kunersdorf was a crushing Russo-Austrian victory, totally scattering the Prussian army and clearing the way to Berlin for the invading coalition. After the battle Frederick believed the war to be totally lost, yet the allies again did not pursue the defeated Prussians or occupy Berlin.

Heavy Russian casualties at Kunersdorf and disagreement between the Russian and Austrian leadership led the cautious Count Saltykov to hold back his forces, giving the Prussians time to regroup. The Russian army's tenuous supply lines through Poland made it difficult to press home the victory so deep in enemy territory, and Prince Henry's manoeuvres in Saxony threatened to cut the Austrians' supply lines, upon which the Russians also partially depended. In September, despite the coalition's overwhelming superiority of force in Brandenburg, both the Russians and Austrians withdrew into Silesia. The coalition's internal conflicts and hesitant leadership had given Prussia a second chance, an event that Frederick later termed the "Miracle of the House of Brandenburg".

==== Saxon campaign ====
In early September Austrian forces in Bohemia pressed into Saxony, which had been largely emptied of defenders in preparation for Kunersdorf, forcing the surrender of Dresden on 4 September and quickly occupying most of the electorate. Prince Henry's force marched west to contest Saxony again, where a contingent under General Friedrich August von Finck sharply defeated a larger Austrian force at the Battle of Korbitz on 21 September. In response, Daun sent a relief force of his own into Saxony, only to have it destroyed by Prince Henry's Prussians on 25 September at the Battle of Hoyerswerda. Chagrined at the prospect of losing Saxony again, Daun then moved his own main force westward into Saxony, leaving behind the Russians, who withdrew into Poland for the winter.

In November, while the Prussian army worked to rebuild itself in Brandenburg and Silesia, a Prussian corps under Finck positioned itself at Maxen to harass Austrian lines of communication between Saxony and Bohemia. Austrian forces under Daun and Count Franz Moritz von Lacy surrounded and overwhelmed Finck's Prussians on 21 November in the Battle of Maxen, forcing the surrender of the entire Prussian corps. Another smaller Austrian victory in Saxony at the Battle of Meissen on 4 December ended the campaigning year.

=== 1760 ===
==== Lower Silesian campaign ====
In early 1760 Laudon was given his own command in Silesia, independent of Daun, and began campaigning there in March. After an inconclusive engagement with the Prussian garrison near Neustadt on 15 March, Laudon's Austrians gradually advanced through Lower Silesia, besieging Glatz on 7 June. De la Motte Fouqué led a force to relieve the fortress, but Laudon engaged and destroyed them on 23 June at the Battle of Landeshut, taking de la Motte Fouqué prisoner. The principal Prussian force under Frederick started eastward to defend Silesia, but it reversed course upon learning that Daun's main army was moving in the same direction. Temporarily abandoning Silesia to Austrian siege, Frederick led his army back into Saxony and besieged Dresden from 13 July. The Prussians hoped either to take Dresden quickly or at least to divide the Austrians' attention; instead, Daun's army marched westward and forced the Prussians to lift the siege and withdraw on 21 July.

Glatz was taken by the Austrians on 29 July, followed shortly by Liegnitz and Parchwitz, and the Austrian armies of Daun and Lacy returned to join with Laudon's force in Lower Silesia. The Prussians under Frederick and Prince Henry attempted to unite and seek a decisive engagement, while Daun moved to attack Frederick's force with overwhelming numbers. Laudon's corps, moving ahead of Daun's main army, attacked Frederick's position near Liegnitz on 15 August. The resulting Battle of Liegnitz ended in a Prussian victory, with the Prussians defeating Laudon before Daun's larger force could arrive to support him. This reversal disrupted the Austrians' manoeuvres and restored Prussian control of Lower Silesia, as Daun moved his army back into Saxony.

==== Battle of Torgau ====
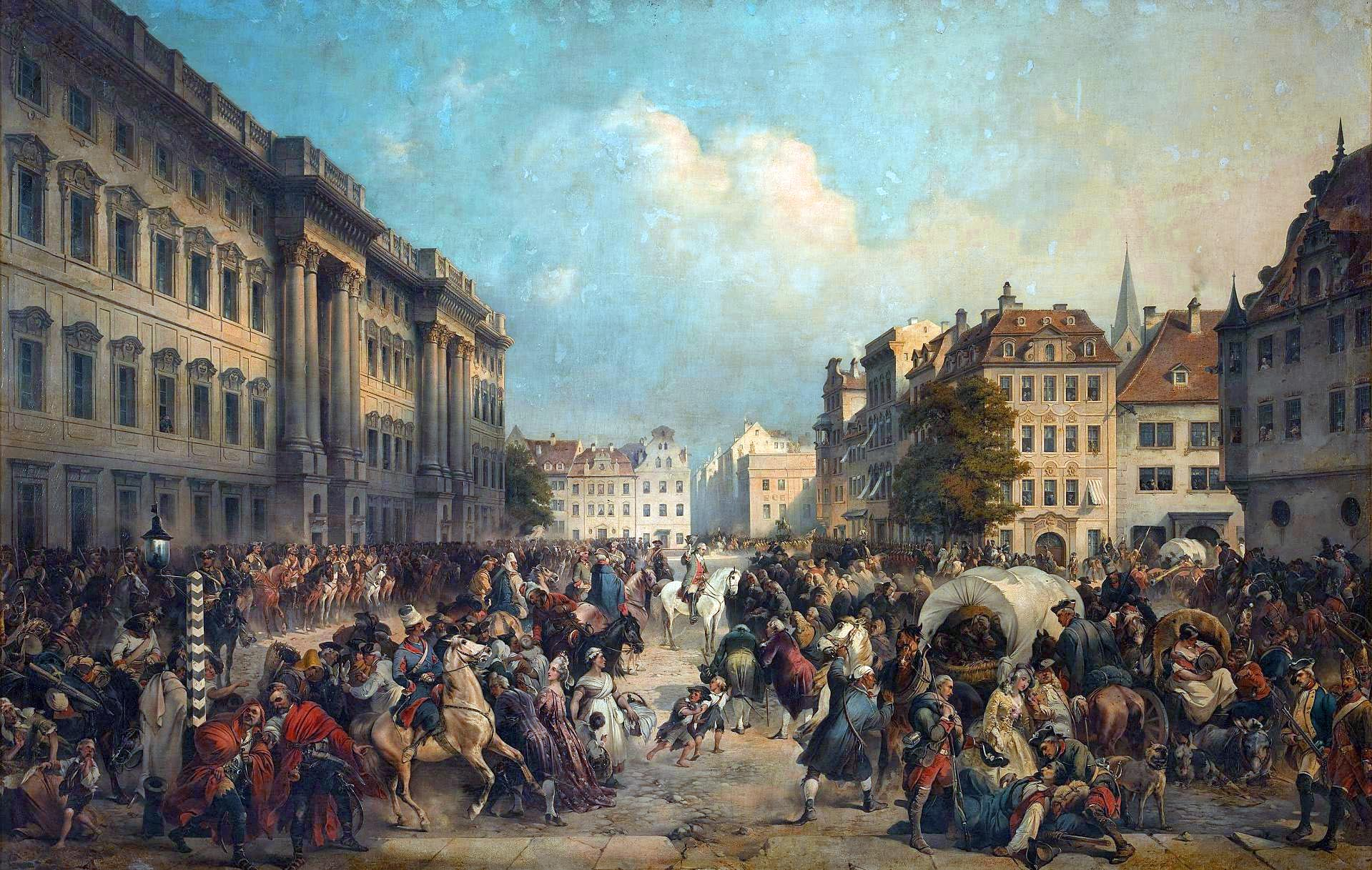
Russian and Austrian troops plundering Berlin in October 1760, as depicted by Alexander von Kotzebue

A secondary Prussian force under General Johann Dietrich von Hülsen repulsed an Austrian advance into Saxony on 20 August in the Battle of Strehla. The Prussians and Austrians spent September skirmishing and manoeuvring in Silesia, while Saltykov's Russians held back in western Poland. With Prussian forces concentrated in Silesia and Saxony, Brandenburg was left largely undefended. In early October a Russian corps under General Gottlob Heinrich Tottleben advanced through Neumark and joined Lacy's Austrians in briefly occupying Berlin, where they demanded ransoms, seized arsenals and freed prisoners of war. However, the Russians soon pulled back to Frankfurt an der Oder for want of supplies, while Lacy's force moved south to support Daun as he sought a decisive engagement with Frederick in Saxony.

The main Prussian and Austrian armies under Frederick, Daun and Lacy finally faced each other on 3 November near Torgau, where the succeeding Battle of Torgau proved very costly for both sides. In the end the Prussians controlled the field and claimed victory, but both armies were badly weakened and soon retreated to winter quarters. Prussia's pyrrhic victory at Torgau resulted in few strategic gains, since Daun still controlled Dresden, and Laudon's army still had the run of Silesia; the Prussian currency had to again be devalued over the winter to stabilise the army's finances. On the other hand, the Austrians, who had hoped to decide the war once and for all at Torgau, were bitterly disappointed to have suffered still another defeat at the hands of a smaller Prussian force, and Maria Theresa's deteriorating finances were beginning to constrain the Austrian war effort. The battle left the war-making capacity of both sides so depleted that neither retained any realistic prospect of bringing the Silesian War to a decisive close without outside help.

=== 1761 ===
==== Dwindling resources ====
By early 1761 neither side retained the men or supplies needed to mount a major offensive. Prussia could field only 104,000 troops, many of them raw recruits, and there were shortages of even basic supplies like muskets for the infantry. The Prussian army was no longer fit for the sort of aggressive manoeuvers that had previously characterised Frederick's tactics, and the kingdom's situation was desperate. Daun, the chief Austrian commander, also ruled out major offensives for the year and made no plans to even attempt to reconquer Silesia, preferring to concentrate his efforts in Saxony against Prince Henry. Austria's finances were in a state of chaos, and its economy was choked by heavy war taxes. Cooperation between Russian and Austrian forces was breaking down, as the two allied powers grew less willing to pursue each other's goals in the field.

==== Russian advances ====
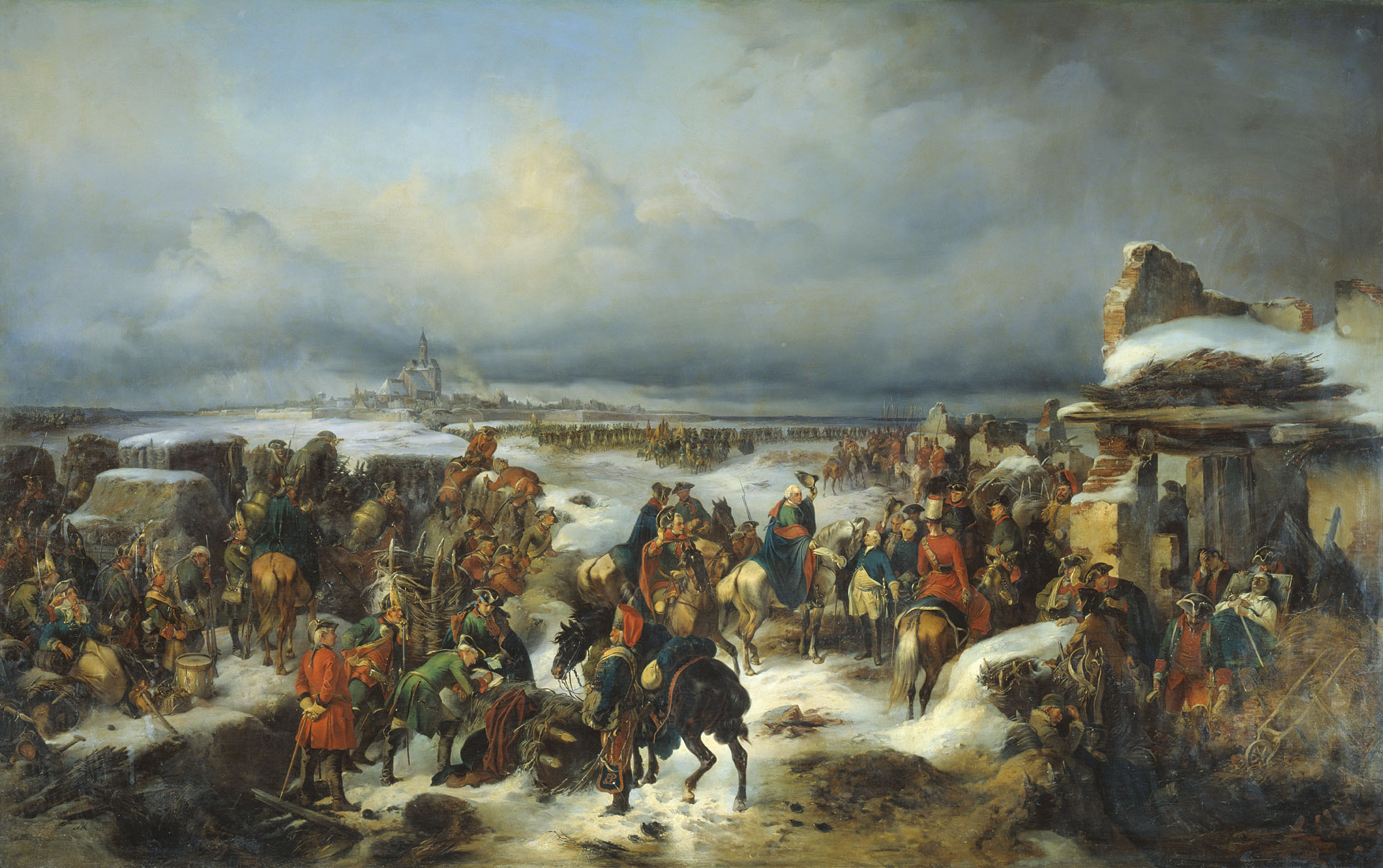
Defeated Prussians withdrawing as Russians take control of Kolberg, as depicted by Alexander von Kotzebue

Russian Marshal Alexander Buturlin, the new commander of Russia's forces in the theatre, coordinated with Laudon's Austrians to begin an advance in southern Silesia in April. The Prussian garrison under General Karl Christoph von der Goltz dug in around Schweidnitz, while field armies under Frederick, Laudon and Buturlin engaged in a prolonged campaign of manoeuver with no major engagements. The allies ended the campaign with a modest victory by storming the fortress at Schweidnitz on 1 October, after which the Prussians fell back to winter quarters in northern Silesia and Brandenburg.

Meanwhile, Russian forces under Zakhar Chernyshev and Pyotr Rumyantsev had besieged and blockaded the Prussian Pomeranian port of Kolberg beginning on 22 August. The town was strongly defended and held out well, but several Prussian attempts to break the siege were unsuccessful. In October Frederick ordered much of the garrison to withdraw to Berlin and defend Brandenburg; the weakened town finally capitulated on 16 December. The fall of Kolberg cost Prussia its last port on the Baltic Sea, and it gave Russia a way to supply its armies in Central Europe by sea, rather than overland through Poland. The resulting benefits to Russian logistics threatened to tip the balance of power decisively against Prussia the following year.

=== 1762 ===
==== The "second miracle" ====
As 1762 began, the Prussian armies had dwindled to only 60,000 men, and it was doubtful whether they could prevent a renewed Russian and Austrian advance to Berlin. A total Prussian collapse seemed imminent; the British now threatened to withdraw their subsidies if Prussia did not offer concessions to secure peace, a threat made good later that year by the new British prime minister, Lord Bute. Then, on 5 January 1762, the ailing Russian Empress Elizabeth died. Her nephew and successor, Emperor Peter III, was an ardent admirer of Frederick's, and he at once reversed Elizabeth's foreign policy and ordered a ceasefire with Prussia.

Peter agreed to an armistice with Prussia in March and lifted the Russian occupation of East Prussia and Pomerania, redirecting his armies to Mecklenburg to threaten Denmark with war over his claims on the Duchy of Holstein-Gottorp. On 15 May Russia and Prussia formally ended their war with the Treaty of Saint Petersburg, confirming Prussia's pre-war borders in the north and east. Peter went on to mediate the 22 May Treaty of Hamburg, ending the Pomeranian War between Prussia and Sweden, with all of Prussia's Pomeranian territory preserved. After signing a new alliance with Prussia on 1 June, he even placed Chernyshev's corps of 18,000 Russian troops under Frederick's command; a second "Miracle of the House of Brandenburg" had occurred.

Meanwhile, French morale had been sapped by prolonged British blockades, defeats in North America and India, and a lack of progress in the Rhineland. After Russia's about-face and Sweden's withdrawal, King Louis realised that France was unlikely to gain its promised reward of the Austrian Netherlands. Austria was virtually bankrupt, and without French subsidies Maria Theresa could not afford a new invasion of Silesia; with France similarly exhausted, Louis was no longer willing to finance his ally's war. Since France had never formally declared war on Prussia, he agreed to a ceasefire with Frederick and evacuated Prussia's territories in the Rhineland, ending France's involvement in the war in Germany.

==== Final campaigns ====
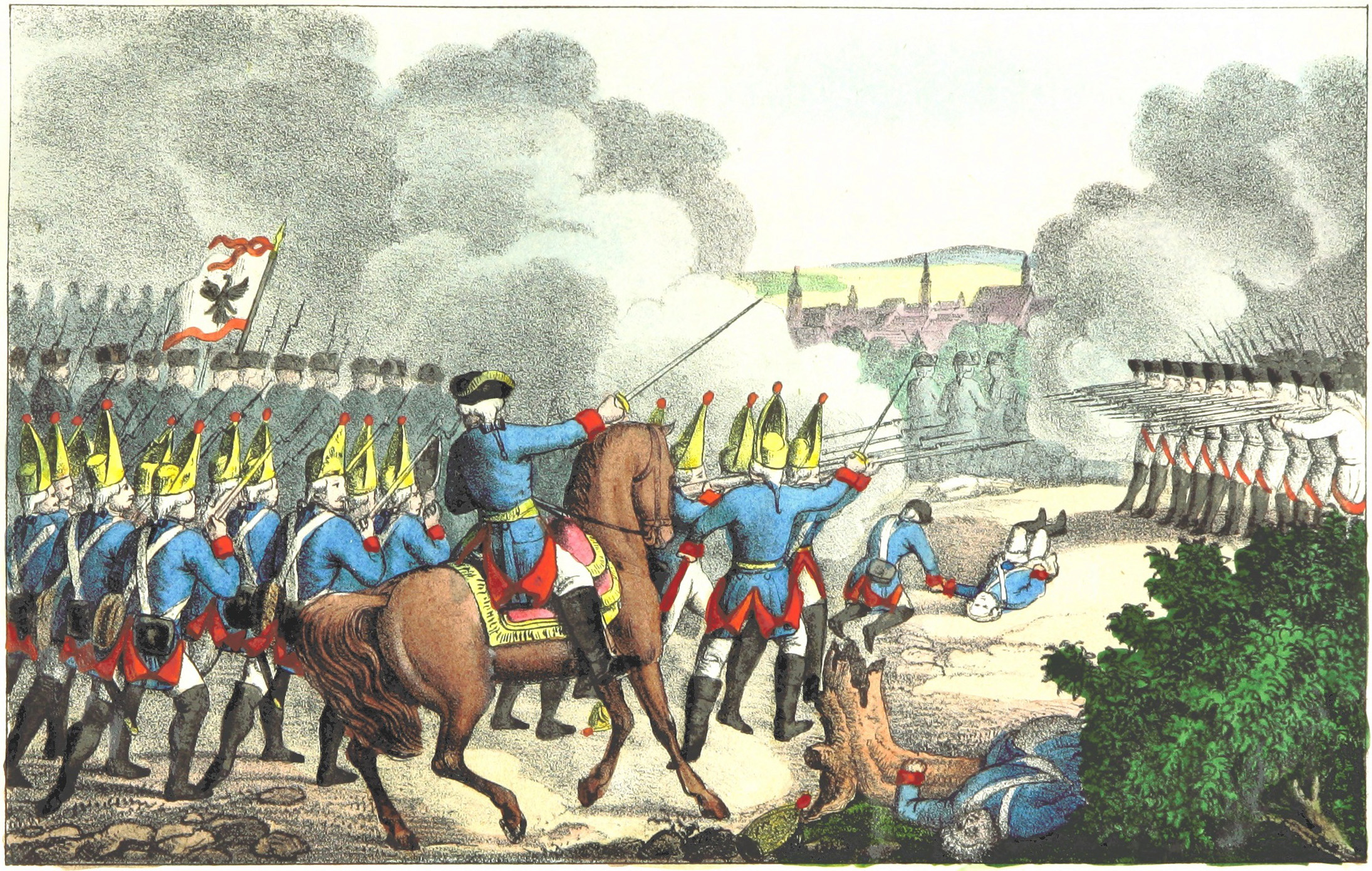
Prussian and Austrian lines facing off at the Battle of Freiberg

With its flanks now secured, Prussia concentrated all of its remaining strength against Austria. The Prussian army, swollen by forces recalled from the north and soon to be augmented by Chernyshev's Russians, could once again match the Austrians' strength in the field, and in June the Prussians marched again to contest Silesia. However, on 9 July Peter was deposed and replaced by his wife, Empress Catherine II (later to be known as Catherine the Great); Catherine immediately withdrew from the alliance her husband had formed with Prussia, but she did not rejoin the war on the Austrian side.

Despite the loss of their Russian auxiliaries, the Prussians engaged Daun's army on 21 July near Burkersdorf, north-east of Schweidnitz. Frederick persuaded Chernyshev to support the attack, not by actually fighting, but merely by remaining in the area and presenting a potential threat to the Austrians. The resulting Prussian victory in the Battle of Burkersdorf led to the recovery of most of Silesia from Austrian control. Daun's forces withdrew to Glatz, and the Prussians besieged Schweidnitz, recapturing it at length on 9 October. Prussia had won its final Silesian campaign.

In the following months Prince Henry led a secondary army into Saxony, where he engaged the Austrian defenders of Dresden near Freiberg on 29 October; the Battle of Freiberg saw the defenders shattered and pursued back to Dresden, after which Prussian forces occupied the majority of Saxony. Prince Henry's army pursued some Reichsarmee forces into Franconia and raided pro-Austrian principalities in the Holy Roman Empire in November and December. In November Maria Theresa proposed to open peace negotiations, to which Frederick immediately agreed; on 24 November the two belligerents declared an armistice in Saxony and Silesia, and formal peace talks began in late December.

==== Stalemate ====
By the end of 1762 Prussia had recovered nearly all of Silesia from the Austrians, and after the Battle of Freiberg it controlled most of Saxony outside of Dresden; Austria still held Dresden and the southeastern edge of Saxony, along with the County of Glatz to the south of Silesia. The warring powers in Central Europe had essentially fought to a stalemate. Prussia's finances were stable, but the country had been devastated by battle and enemy occupation, and its manpower was spent. Austria was facing a severe financial crisis and had to reduce the size of its army, greatly decreasing its offensive power; without Russian troops or French subsidies, it had little hope of reconquering Silesia. The other belligerents in the wider Seven Years' War had already begun peace talks; now, negotiators from Austria, Prussia and Saxony convened on 30 December at Hubertusburg palace, near the front lines in Saxony, to discuss terms of peace.

=== 1763 ===
==== Treaty of Hubertusburg ====
Frederick had earlier considered offering East Prussia to Russia in return for Peter's support for his seizure of Saxony, but Catherine's withdrawal meant that Russia was no longer a belligerent and did not participate in the negotiations. The warring parties eventually agreed to simply restore their respective conquests to each other: Austria would withdraw from Glatz, restoring full Prussian control of Silesia, in exchange for Prussia's evacuation of Saxony, which would be returned to Frederick Augustus, who would receive no other reparations from Prussia. With these swaps, the borders in the region arrived precisely back at the status quo ante bellum. Austria made a further concession by formally renouncing its claim to Silesia; in return, Prussia committed to support Maria Theresa's son, Archduke Joseph, in the forthcoming 1764 Imperial election. With that, the belligerents agreed to end the Third Silesian War with the Treaty of Hubertusburg, signed 15 February 1763.

== Outcomes ==
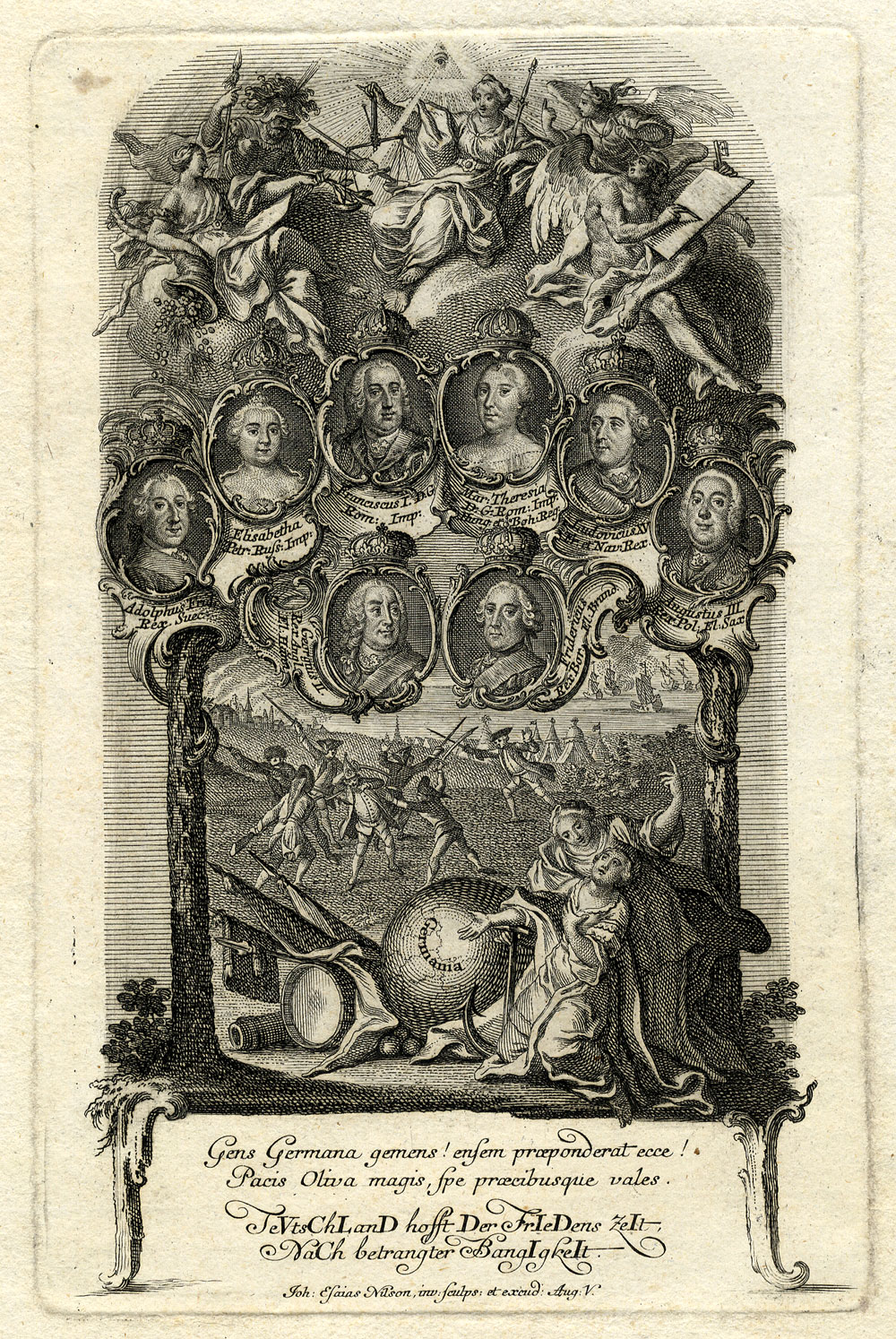
Contemporary engraving celebrating the restoration of peace in Germany, by Johannes Esaias Nilson

The return to territorial status quo ante meant that none of the belligerents in the Silesian War gained the prize it had aimed at: Prussia failed to keep any part of Saxony, while Austria was unable to recover its lost province of Silesia, nor did Russia gain any territory at Prussia's expense. Nonetheless, the outcome of the war has generally been considered a diplomatic victory for Prussia, which not only retained Silesia, but also compelled Austria to acknowledge its sovereignty in the province, forestalling any further Silesian Wars. More fundamentally, Prussia showed itself to be a credible rival to Austria by successfully surviving intact what could have become a war of partition.

=== Prussia ===
Prussia emerged from the war as a new European great power, establishing itself as the leading power of Protestant Germany. The kingdom won general recognition of its sovereignty in Silesia, putting a stop to Austria's attempts to recover the province. Frederick the Great's personal reputation was enormously enhanced, as his debts to fortune (Russia's about-face after Elizabeth's death) and to British financial support were soon forgotten, while the memories of his energetic leadership and tactical successes were strenuously kept alive. Prussia had held its own while being simultaneously invaded by Austria, Russia, Sweden, and France, an accomplishment that appeared miraculous to contemporary observers. After 1763, armies around the world sent their officers to Prussia to learn the secrets of the state's outsize military power, making Prussia one of the most imitated states in Europe.

Though sometimes depicted as a key moment in Prussia's rise to greatness, the war nonetheless left the kingdom's economy and population devastated, and much of the remainder of Frederick's reign was spent repairing the damage. To mitigate population losses, the King continued his father's policy of encouraging Protestant refugees from Catholic realms to resettle in Prussia. The repeated currency devaluations imposed to finance the conflict had led to rapid inflation and great economic disruption in Prussia (and in Saxony). After the war the state began using its network of military grain depots and the excise on grains to stabilise food prices and alleviate grain shortages. Prussia also established a rudimentary social welfare system for impoverished and disabled veterans of the Silesian Wars.

Prussia's armed forces had experienced heavy casualties in the war, with around 180,000 men killed, and the officer corps was severely depleted. After the peace the state had neither the money nor the manpower to rebuild the army to what it had been before the war. By 1772 Prussia's standing army was restored to 190,000 men, but few of the officers were veterans of the Silesian Wars. In the succeeding War of the Bavarian Succession (1778–1779) the Prussians fought poorly, despite again being personally led by Frederick, and the Prussian army did not fare well against revolutionary France in 1792–1795. In 1806 the Prussians were shattered by Napoleon's French at the Battle of Jena; only after a series of reforms motivated by the disasters of 1806–1807 did Prussian military power again begin to grow.

=== Austria ===
The war left the Habsburg monarchy deeply in debt, and its armed forces were greatly weakened, with more than 145,000 men dead or missing in the conflict. Austria was not able to retake Silesia or realise any other territorial gains, but it did preserve Saxony from Prussian control, slowing the growth of its new northern rival. Its military performed far more respectably than during the War of the Austrian Succession, which seemed to vindicate Maria Theresa's administrative and military reforms since that war. Thus, the war in great part restored Austria's prestige and preserved its position as a major player in the European system. By agreeing to vote for Archduke Joseph in the Imperial election, Frederick accepted the continuation of Habsburg pre-eminence in the Holy Roman Empire, though this was far less than Austria had hoped to win in the war.

Prussia's confirmation as a first-rate power and the enhanced prestige of its king and army were long-term threats to Austria's hegemony in Germany. The Silesian Wars made clear that the Habsburg monarchy would need sustained reform if it was to retain its dominant position in European power politics. After the disappointment of the Third Silesian War Maria Theresa finally abandoned the hope of recovering Silesia, focusing instead on domestic reforms to better prepare the realm for future conflicts with Prussia. In 1761 the Habsburg monarchy implemented newly centralised administrative and policymaking bodies to streamline what had often been a chaotic executive process. The 1760s and 1770s saw vigorous efforts to improve tax collection, particularly in Lombardy and the Austrian Netherlands, which led to significant increases in state revenues. In 1766 the crown promulgated its first common code of laws, the Codex Theresianus, in an effort to unify the realm's various legal systems. Aiming to increase the peasantry's ability to contribute to the state's tax base, Maria Theresa issued a series of Robot Patents between 1771 and 1778 restricting forced peasant labour in her German and Bohemian lands, and her son would carry the process further with his Serfdom Patent. The state also implemented compulsory primary education and established a system of secular public schools. Beginning with these so-called Theresian reforms, wide-ranging efforts to modernise the Habsburg monarchy over the next half century grew out of Austria's defeat.

== Sources ==
- Anderson, Fred (2000). Crucible of War: The Seven Years' War and the Fate of Empire in British North America, 1754–1766. New York: Vintage Books. ISBN 978-0-375-70636-3.
- Asprey, Robert B. (1986). Frederick the Great: The Magnificent Enigma. New York: Ticknor and Fields. ISBN 978-0-89919-352-6.
- Black, Jeremy (1990). "Essay and Reflection: On the 'Old System' and the 'Diplomatic Revolution' of the Eighteenth Century". International History Review. 12 (2): 301–323. doi:10.1080/07075332.1990.9640547.
- Black, Jeremy (1994). European Warfare, 1660–1815. London: UCL Press. ISBN 978-1-85728-172-9.
- Browning, Reed (April 2005). "New Views on the Silesian Wars". Journal of Military History. 69 (2): 521–534. doi:10.1353/jmh.2005.0077. S2CID 159463824.
- Carlyle, Thomas (1865a). Book XIX – Friedrich Like to Be Overwhelmed in the Seven Years' War – 1759–1760. History of Friedrich II of Prussia, Called Frederick the Great. Vol. V. London: Chapman & Hall. OCLC 1045538020.
- Carlyle, Thomas (1865b). Book XX – Friedrich Is Not to Be Overwhelmed: the Seven Years' War Gradually Ends – 25th April 1760 – 15th February 1763. History of Friedrich II of Prussia, Called Frederick the Great. Vol. VI. London: Chapman & Hall. OCLC 1045538020.
- Chisholm, Hugh, ed. (1911). "Finck, Friedrich August von" . Encyclopædia Britannica. Vol. 10 (11th ed.). Cambridge University Press. p. 353. OCLC 873787655.
- Clark, Christopher (2006). Iron Kingdom: The Rise and Downfall of Prussia, 1600–1947. Cambridge, Massachusetts: Belknap Press. ISBN 978-0-674-02385-7.
- Clodfelter, Micheal (2017). Warfare and Armed Conflicts: A Statistical Encyclopedia of Casualty and Other Figures, 1492–2015 (4th ed.). Jefferson, North Carolina: McFarland & Company. ISBN 978-0-7864-7470-7.
- Creveld, Martin van (1977). Supplying War: Logistics from Wallenstein to Patton. Cambridge: Cambridge University Press. ISBN 978-0-521-21730-9.
- Duffy, Christopher (1974). The Army of Frederick the Great. New York: Hippocrene Books. ISBN 978-0-88254-277-5.
- Duffy, Christopher (1985). Frederick the Great: A Military Life. London: Routledge. ISBN 978-0-415-00276-9.
- Fraser, David (2000). Frederick the Great: King of Prussia. London: Allen Lane. ISBN 978-0-7139-9377-6.
- Hochedlinger, Michael (2003). Austria's Wars of Emergence: War, State and Society in the Habsburg Monarchy, 1683–1797. London: Longman. ISBN 978-0-582-29084-6.
- Horn, D. B. (1957). "The Diplomatic Revolution". In Lindsay, J. O. (ed.). The New Cambridge Modern History vol. 7, The Old Regime: 1713–63. Cambridge: Cambridge University Press. pp. 449–464. ISBN 978-0-521-04545-2.
- Ingrao, Charles W. (1994). The Habsburg Monarchy, 1618–1815. Cambridge: Cambridge University Press. ISBN 978-0-521-38009-6.
- Kohlrausch, Friedrich (1844). A History of Germany: From the Earliest Period to the Present Time. London: Chapman & Hall.
- Luvaas, Jay (2009). "Frederick and the Art of War". Frederick the Great on the Art of War. By Friedrich II, King of Prussia. Luvaas, Jay (ed.). New York: Da Capo Press. ISBN 978-0-7867-4977-5.
- Marston, Daniel (2001). The Seven Years' War. London: Osprey Publishing. ISBN 978-1-4728-9564-6.
- Mitford, Nancy; Schillinger, Liesl (2013). Frederick the Great. New York: New York Review Books. ISBN 978-1-59017-623-8.
- Redman, Herbert (2014). Frederick the Great and the Seven Years' War, 1756–1763. Jefferson, North Carolina: McFarland & Company. ISBN 978-0-7864-7669-5.
- Schweizer, Karl W. (1989). England, Prussia, and the Seven Years War: Studies in Alliance Policies and Diplomacy. Lewiston, New York: Edwin Mellen Press. ISBN 978-0-88946-465-0.
- Shennan, J. H. (2005). International Relations in Europe, 1689–1789. London: Taylor & Francis. ISBN 978-1-134-89996-8.
- Showalter, Dennis E. (2012). Frederick the Great: A Military History. Barnsley, England: Frontline Books. ISBN 978-1-78303-479-6.
- Stone, David (2006). A Military History of Russia: From Ivan the Terrible to the War in Chechnya. Westport, Connecticut: Praeger Publishing. ISBN 978-0-275-98502-8.
- Szabo, Franz A. J. (2008). The Seven Years' War in Europe 1756–1763. London: Longman. ISBN 978-0-582-29272-7.
- Vocelka, Karl (2000). Geschichte Österreichs: Kultur, Gesellschaft, Politik (in German). Graz: Styria Media Group. ISBN 978-3-222-12825-7.
- Wilson, Peter H. (2016). Heart of Europe: A History of the Holy Roman Empire. Cambridge, Massachusetts: Harvard University Press. ISBN 978-0-674-05809-5.
