= Siege of Schweidnitz (1762) =

1762 Third Silesian War siege

- Part of the Third Silesian War (Seven Years' War)
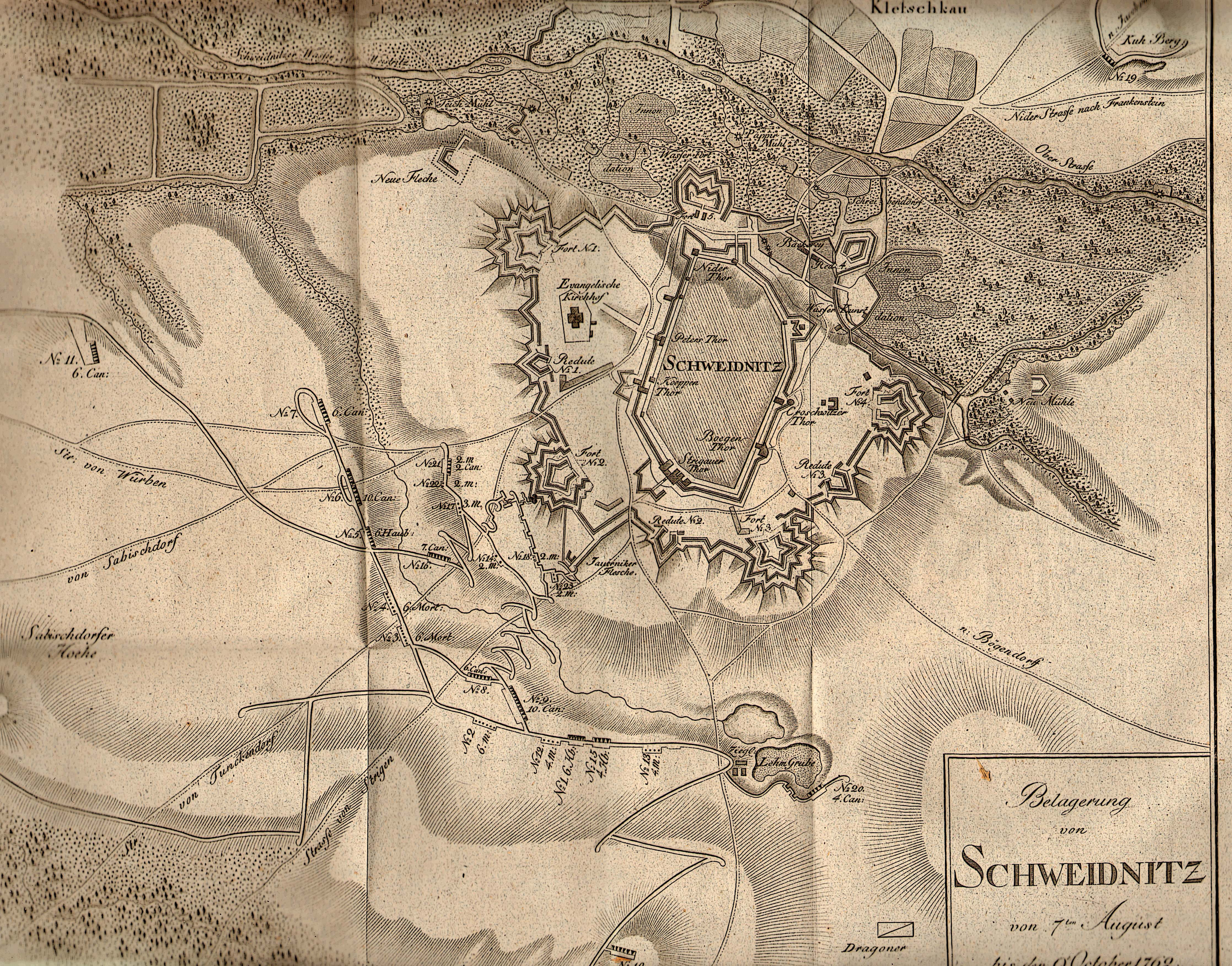
Date	7 August – 9 October 1762
Location	Schweidnitz, Silesia 50°51′N 16°29′E
Result	Prussian victory

Belligerents
(Kingdom of Prussia) Prussia	(Holy Roman Empire) Austria

Commanders and leaders
Frederick II of Prussia; Friedrich Bogislav von Tauentzien; Duke of Bevern	Franz Guasco; Leopold Joseph von Daun

Strength
25,000	10,000

Casualties and losses
3,033 killed and wounded	Entire army captured or killed 3,552 killed and wounded 9,000 captured(including the wounded)

Frederick the Great
current battle
First Silesian War
Second Silesian War
Third Silesian War

The siege of Schweidnitz took place between August and October 1762 during the Third Silesian War, part of the wider Seven Years' War. Prussian forces under the overall command of Frederick II laid siege to the city of Schweidnitz, in an attempt to retake it from an Austrian garrison.

== Background ==
Schweidnitz was the anchor of Prussia's position in Silesia during the war, due to its central location and major supply depots. It had been stormed the previous year by Austrian forces under Ernst Gideon von Laudon. The Austrians hoped to hold onto the city as a bargaining chip in any potential peace talks. Frederick was equally determined to recover the city, particularly as the departure of Russia and Sweden from the war allowed him to take the offensive once more.

== Siege and relief attempts ==
Having isolated Schweidnitz from the main Austrian field army under Leopold Joseph von Daun, siege works were begun and a major bombardment commenced on 9 August. He deployed a force under Duke of Bevern to a covering position at Reichenbach where he was able to frustrate Daun's attempts to march to the city's aid in action which produced 1,000 casualties.

Six days after the defeat of this relief attempt, the commander of Schweidnitz offered to surrender the city. However, Frederick rejected his demand that his men be allowed to march away with the honours of war. Frederick demanded instead that the entire garrison surrender as prisoners of war, and the siege continued. In September he threatened to put the garrison to the sword if they did not surrender immediately. The Prussians were able to thwart another major effort by Daun to relieve the garrison.

On 8 October a Prussian mine, dug under the city, exploded the garrison's gunpowder magazine. The following day, Schweidnitz finally capitulated. Both sides had suffered around 3,000 casualties during the two month siege. In recognition of the city's resistance, the Austrian Empress Maria Theresa promoted the senior offices and rewarded the entire garrison following their release from captivity.

== Aftermath ==
Along with the Prussian victory at Battle of Freiberg, it was one of the final acts of the war. A peace agreement was signed between the warring sides in early 1763. The Treaty of Hubertusburg acknowledged the return of all Silesian territory to Prussia.

== Bibliography ==
- Bodart, G. (1908). Militär-historisches Kriegs-Lexikon (1618-1905).
- Szabo, Franz A.J. The Seven Years War in Europe, 1756-1763. Pearson, 2008.
- Clodfelter, M. (2017). Warfare and Armed Conflicts: A Statistical Encyclopedia of Casualty and Other Figures, 1492-2015 (4th ed.). Jefferson, North Carolina: McFarland. ISBN 978-0-7864-7470-7.
