= Battle of Reichenberg =

1757 battle of the Third Silesian War

Coordinates: 50.7670°N 15.0561°E

- Part of the Third Silesian War (Seven Years' War)
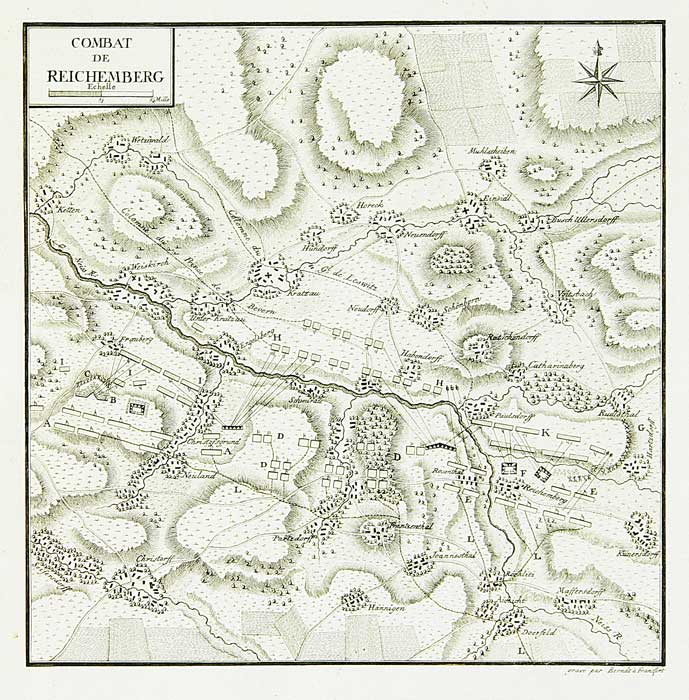
- Battle plan at Reichenberg
Date	21 April 1757
Location	Liberec, Bohemia, present-day Czech Republic
Result	Prussian victory

Belligerents
(Kingdom of Prussia) Prussia	(Holy Roman Empire) Austria

Commanders and leaders
(Kingdom of Prussia) Duke of Brunswick-Bevern	(Holy Roman Empire) Count Königsegg

Strength
15,000	14,000

Casualties and losses
655	874

The Battle of Reichenberg took place during the Third Silesian War (part of the Seven Years' War) on 21 April 1757 near the town of Reichenberg (Czech: Liberec) in Bohemia.

== Background ==
Marshal von Bevern had entered Bohemia with a corps of 15,000 Prussians. At Reichenberg he encountered Königsegg's Austrian corps. The full Austrian corps consisted of 18,000 infantry and 4,900 cavalry, but only about 14,000 of them had been concentrated at Reichenberg.

The experienced Bevern defeated his opponent. As a result, Bevern captured large quantities of Austrian supplies and could continue his march on Prague.

== Order of Battle ==
=== Austrian Forces ===
Austrian Forces during the battle were:

- Commander-in-Chief, Feldzeugmeister (General of Artillery) Christian Eusebius, Count von Königsegg-Rothenfels
- Vanguard (at the outskirts of the woods to the East of Reichenberg)
  - Splényi Hussarregiment (2 Sqns)
  - Karlstädter Grenz-Hussarregiment (1 Sqn)
- Main Corps
  - Right Wing, under Major-General Count Franz Moritz von Lacy
    - on the left bank of the Neisse in the entrenchments in-front of Reichenberg
      - Starhemberg Infanterieregiment (1 Btn)
      - Sprecher Infanterieregiment (1 Btn)
    - behind the entrenchments between Rosenthal and Franzesdorf on the right bank of the Neisse
      - Sincère Infanterieregiment (2 Btns)
      - Gyulay Infanterieregiment (1 Btn)
      - Forgách Infanterieregiment (1 Btn)
      - Mercy-Argenteau Infanterieregiment (1 Btn)
      - Warasdiner-Creutzer Grenzerbataillon
      - 2 Field artillery batteries
  - Left Wing, under Christian Eusebius, Count von Königsegg-Rothenfels on the left bank of the Neisse
    - Infantry (in the entrenchments)
      - Converged Grenadiers (8 Coys)
      - Converged Grenadiers (2 Coys)
      - Mercy-Argenteau Infanterieregiment (1 Btn)
      - Karlstädter-Szluiner Grenzerbataillon
      - 1 Field artillery battery
    - Cavalry, under Lieutenant-General the Count von Porporati deployed in two lines to the left of the entrenchments on the left bank
      - Converged Carabiniers (2 Sqns)
      - Pálffy Kürassierregiment (6 Sqns)
      - Löwenstein Kürassierregiment (3 Sqns)
      - Lichtenstein Dragonerregiment (6 Sqns)
      - Porporati Dragonerregiment (2 Sqns)
      - Batthyányi Dragonerregiment (2 Sqns)
    - Extreme left, occupying an isolated barricade in the woods
      - Haller Infanterieregiment (2 Btns), occupying another barricade just behind the previous one
      - Karlstädter-Szluiner Grenzerbataillon
      - Sincère Infanterieregiment (2 Grenadier coys)
    - Major-General Count von Würben's Brigade, arriving from Gabel (2 Btns making themselves ready in a clearing while the others were still on the march)
      - Khuel Infanterieregiment (1 Btn)
      - Leopold Pálffy Infanterieregiment (1 Btn)
    - Another 10 Btns and 14 Grenadier coys were posted at Gabel under Field Marshal Maquire to defend the Passes of Lusatia

=== Prussian Forces ===
Prussian Forces during the battle were (cavalry maintained 4 sqns and infantry had 2 battalions):

- Commander-in-Chief, August Wilhelm, Duke of Braunschweig-Wolfenbüttel-Bevern
  - Infantry Commander, Lieutenant-General Hans Sigismund von Lestwitz
  - Cavalry Commander, Major-General Frederick II Eugene, Duke of Württemberg
- Puttkamer Hussarregiment (vanguard)
- 1 battery of 12 × 12-pounder guns
- First Line
  - Kahlden Grenadierbataillon
  - Möllendorf Grenadierbataillon
  - Billerbeck Greandierbataillon
  - Prinz von Prußen Infanterieregiment
  - Darmstadt Infanterieregiment
  - Forcade Infanterieregiment
  - Amstell Infanterieregiment
  - Kleist Infanterieregiment
- Second Line
  - Normann Dragonerregiment
  - Katte Dragonerregiment
  - Würtemburg Dragonerregiment
  - Puttkamer Hussarregiment
  - Prinz Heinrich Fusilierregiment

== Sources ==
- Bodart, G. (1908). Militär-historisches Kriegs-Lexikon (1618-1905).
