= Battle of Maxen =

1759 battle

Coordinates: 50.9236°N 13.8028°E

- Part of the Third Silesian War (Seven Years' War)
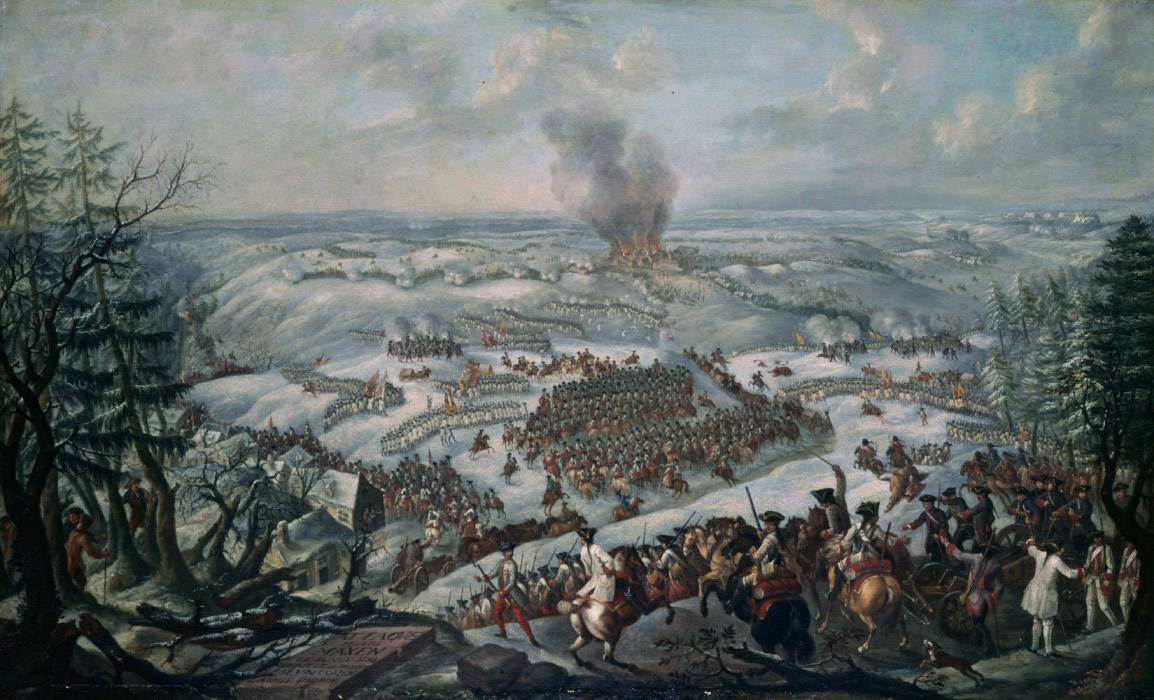
- Painting by Franz Paul Findenigg, circa 1760
Date	20 November 1759
Location	Maxen, Electorate of Saxony
Result	Austrian victory

Belligerents
(Holy Roman Empire) Austria	(Kingdom of Prussia) Prussia

Commanders and leaders
Leopold Josef Graf Daun	Friedrich August von Finck (POW) (surrendered)

Strength
32,000	14,000

Casualties and losses
304 dead, 630 wounded	2,000 dead and wounded, 11,741 captured

The Battle of Maxen (20 November 1759) was a battle at Maxen, in the Electorate of Saxony during the Third Silesian War (part of the Seven Years' War). It resulted in surrender of a Prussian corps.

The Prussian corps of 14,000 men, commanded by Friedrich August von Finck (one of Frederick the Great's generals), was sent to threaten lines of communication between the Austrian army at Dresden and Bohemia. Field Marshal Count Daun attacked and defeated Finck's isolated corps on 20 November 1759 with his army of 40,000 men. The next day (21 November) Finck decided to surrender.

== Background ==
After the victories obtained in previous years, 1759 saw a succession of serious failures for the forces of the Kingdom of Prussia, engaged in a relentless struggle against a vast coalition of enemies including the Habsburg monarchy, the Holy Roman Empire, the Kingdom of France, the Russian Empire and Sweden. Due to the wear and tear of his forces, King Frederick II of Prussia had had to renounce the strategy, by now becoming habitual, of anticipating the movements of his opponents by launching offensives in the direction of the territories occupied by the enemy to instead take a more defensive conduct, aimed at in particular to prevent the gathering into a single mass of the Austrian and Russian armies; the monarch's action had not had a positive outcome: defeat of the Prussian army of General Carl Heinrich von Wedel in the Battle of Kay on 23 July 1759, the Russian forces of General Pyotr Saltykov had reunited with the Austrian units of Marshal Ernst Gideon von Laudon in Silesia and the following 12 August had inflicted a catastrophic defeat on Frederick II himself in the Battle of Kunersdorf.

The defeat at Kunersdorf left the Prussian army half-destroyed and the way to Berlin open, but the allies did not know how to take advantage of it: the Russians had suffered heavy losses and, after a series of unsuccessful maneuvers, Saltykov brought his forces back to the quarters set up in Poland leaving the Austrians of Laudon alone, who eventually also withdrew from Silesia. While the Austro-Russians faced Frederick in Silesia, a second Austrian army under the command of Marshal Leopold Josef Graf Daun had operated in the lands of the Electorate of Saxony, occupied by the Prussians since the start of the war, against the forces under the command of Prince Henry of Prussia; the Austrians had initially gained ground by even occupying the Saxon capital, Dresden, on 6 September, but on 25 September Prince Henry had obtained a victory against an Austrian detachment in the Battle of Hoyerswerda: with lines of communication with Bohemia threatened, Daun had to order a retreat to the south while continuing to maintain possession of Dresden.

Having confirmed that the Russians had withdrawn from Silesia, Frederick had returned the forces to his orders in Saxony in support of his brother with whom he was reunited on 13 November; the Saxon lands were an important source of supplies and recruits for the Prussians, and despite the advanced season Frederick decided to continue the war operations in order to drive Daun back to Bohemia and regain control of Dresden. To induce the Austrians to abandon the Saxon capital, on 15 November Frederick made the decision to detach the body of General Friedrich August von Finck from the main army, sending him to infiltrate the rear of Daun to threaten the lines of communication; the move, however, inevitably ended up isolating Finck's troops within the much larger Austrian forces, inviting Daun to attack him.

== Battle ==
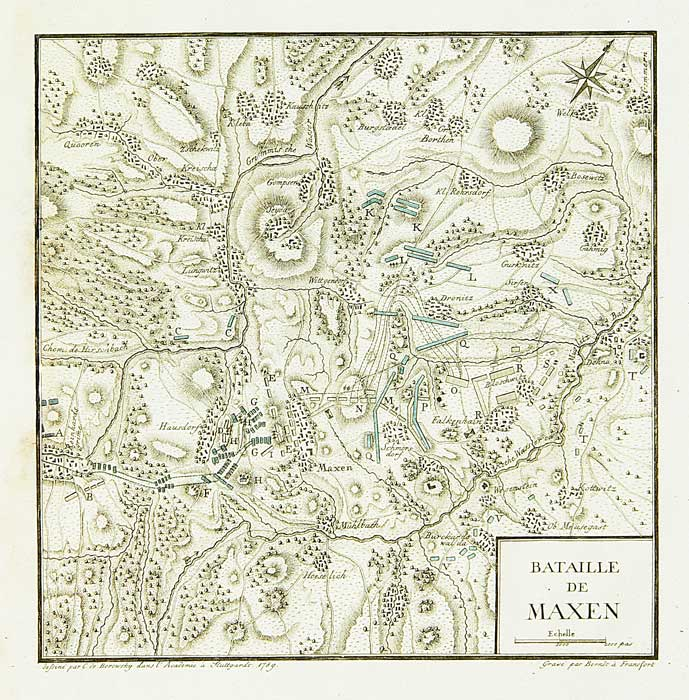
Map of the Battle of Maxen

On 19 November Finck's forces amounted to about 14,000 men, had reached the village of Maxen, located in a small valley of the Ore Mountains (Erzgebirge); The forces of Daun, on the other hand, had reached, protected by the fog, the town of Dippoldiswalde south-west of Maxen, with other Austrian troops under General Anton Joseph von Brentano-Cimaroli attested further north between Wittgendorf and Tronitz and some departments of the Imperial Reichsarmee guarding Dohna to the northeast. While Daun had his troops, numbering about 32,000 men, camp for the night, Finck stood in a defensive position in the hills around Maxen.

On the morning of 20 November, the Austrians from Daun set off from Dippoldiswalde divided into four columns heading towards Maxen, while the forces of Brentano also moved south to converge on the town; the ground, frozen and covered by a first splash of snow, made it difficult for the cavalry and artillery to move around. Daun's vanguard encountered the first Prussian pickets near the village of Rheinhadrtsgrimma, who, at Finck's instructions, withdrew from the village; the Austrian grenadiers then climbed the hills behind the town, allowing their artillery to take up a position to beat the left side of the Prussian line. Starting at 11:00 an intense cannonade developed on both sides for the next 45 minutes, until Daun ordered the advance to be resumed: five battalions of Austrian grenadiers led the attack on the hills in front of the towns of Wittgensdorf and Maxen, routing the Prussian battalions that held them and pushing up to enter Maxen itself. The entire left wing of the Prussians was therefore isolated from the right wing and had to turn north towards the village of Schmorsdorf.

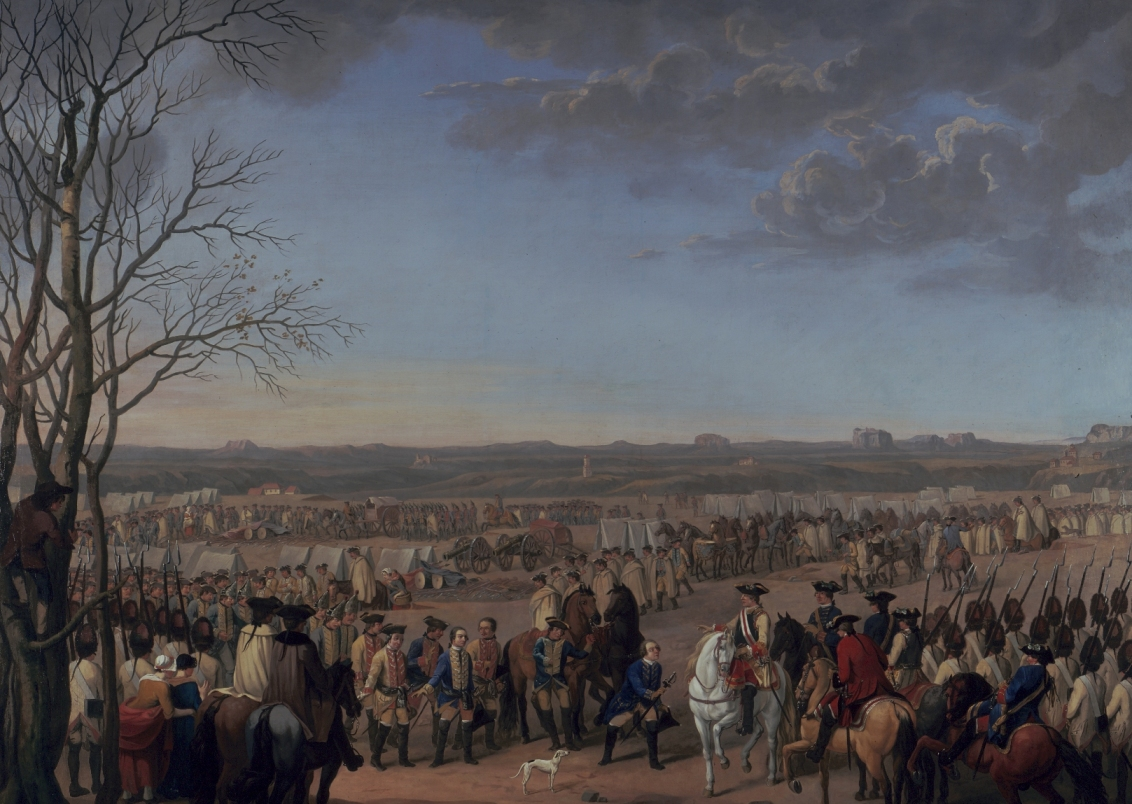
The surrender of General Finck to the Austrians after the Battle of Maxen by Hyacinth de La Pegna.

Meanwhile, the Austrian body of Brentano had lined up to face the right wing of the Prussians, coming to envelop the enemy line; Finck tried to stop him by launching a formation of cuirassiers in a counterattack, but the Prussian cavalry ran into too difficult terrain and their charge was easily repelled by the Austrian infantry. Finck tried to rally his confused units near Schmorsdorf, while Daun reconnected with Brentano's troops on the left; the Austrians then launched a general attack that routed the Prussian infantry, which left several flags and cannons in the hands of the enemy as well as many prisoners. The Prussian cavalry attempted to counterattack, but was in turn charged by a regiment of Austrian dragoons which routed it. Finck led what was left of his forces to rejoin the contingent of detached General Wunsch to face the Reichsarmee troops at Dohna; the Prussians were now completely surrounded, while the Austrians, firmly established on the hills they had conquered, received supplies and reinforcements of fresh troops during the night. Finck planned for the next day, 21 November, an attempt to break the encirclement by launching an attack from Schmorsdorf, but his infantry was now decimated, and finally the Prussian commander decided to request for a surrender to the Austrians while his cavalry, under the command of Wunsch, tried to escape from the battlefield by passing through the lines of the imperial troops. Daun accepted the Prussian surrender, but insisted that it also be extended to the cavalry of Wunsch which Finck claimed to be a separate corps from his command; informed that Wunsch had failed to find an escape route for his cuirassiers, Finck was eventually persuaded to sign the capitulation on behalf of his entire force.

== Consequences ==
Finck's entire Prussian force was lost in the battle, leaving 3,000 dead and wounded on the ground as well as 11,000 prisoners of war; the booty fallen into the hands of the Austrians also included 71 artillery pieces, 96 flags and 44 ammunition wagons. The success cost Daun's forces only 934 casualties including dead and wounded. The defeat at Maxen was another blow to the decimated ranks of the Prussian army, and infuriated Frederick to such an extent that General Finck was court-martialed and sentenced to two years in prison after the war. However, Daun decided not to exploit the success in the slightest to attempt offensive maneuvers and retired to his winter quarters near Dresden, marking the conclusion of the war operations for 1759.

== Bibliography ==
- Rickard, J., 5 November 2000, Battle of Maxen, 20 November 1759, http://www.historyofwar.org/articles/battles_maxen.html
