= Battle of Meissen =

1759 battle

Coordinates: 51.1636°N 13.4775°E

- Part of the Third Silesian War (Seven Years' War)
Date	4 December 1759
Location	Meissen, Saxony, present-day Germany
Result	Austrian victory

Belligerents
(Holy Roman Empire) Austria	(Kingdom of Prussia) Prussia

Commanders and leaders
(Holy Roman Empire) Philipp Levin von Beck	(Kingdom of Prussia) Christian Friedrich von Diericke (POW)

Strength
8,000	3,500

Casualties and losses
187; 72 killed 115 wounded	1,943; 400 killed or wounded 1,543 captured

The Battle of Meissen (4 December 1759) was an Austrian victory over a smaller Prussian force during the Third Silesian War (part of the Seven Years' War). An Austrian force under the command of general Beck assaulted 3,500 Prussian troops under Diericke at Meissen, overwhelming them and driving the survivors across the Elbe. The Prussians lost 400 men in the action and 1,543 fell prisoner. Austrian losses were few, totalling only 72 killed and 115 wounded. The Austrians secured an important victory, which effectively kept their ally Saxony in the war.
