= Battle of Neustadt (1760) =

18th century battle between Prussia and Austria

- Part of the Third Silesian War (Seven Years' War)
Date	25 March 1760
Location	Neustadt, Prussian Silesia (now Prudnik, Poland) 50°19′11″N 17°34′45″E
Result	Indecisive

Belligerents
(Kingdom of Prussia) Prussia	Austria

Commanders and leaders
Lt. Gen. Goltze; Capt. Blumenthal; Capt. Zittzwitz	Ernst von Laudon; Gen. Jacquemin

Casualties and losses
35 dead 65 wounded 70 missing	300 dead 500 wounded 25 captured

The Battle of Neustadt on 15 March 1760 saw the Prussian army engaged with the Austrian army under Ernst von Laudon during the Third Silesian War (part of the Seven Years' War). Although the Austrians were left in possession of the town, their losses were much greater than those of the Prussians.

== The battle ==
The attempt of General Laudon, to surprise the Prussian troops at Neustadt (now Prudnik, Poland), though attended with greater loss, did not satisfy the enemy's wishes.

On 15 March 1760, Lieutenant general Baron Goltze, having received intelligence of General Laudon's assembling his troops, and of the enemy's cavalry and infantry having moved behind the Opava towards Hotzenplotz and Johannisthal, recalled all his detachments, and began his march towards Neisse on the 15th instant, with his whole force. In the meantime General Laudon, who had few out from his quarters on the 14th, with Palsy's regiment of cuirassiers, Löwenstein's dragoons, 500 hussars of Nadaski, 500 of Kalnocki, 2,000 Croats, and 14 companies of grenadiers, marched all night, with a view to surprise the Prussian troops at Neustadt. The latter were scarce out of the gates, when they were surrounded by those of the enemy. General Jacquemin was posted with the regiment of Löwenstein near Buchelsdorf on the road to Steinau, General Laudon followed, with the regiment of Palfy, and 2,000 Croats, supported by fourteen companies of grenadiers, 1,000 of their hussars were upon the right flank of the Prussians, the advanced guard of which consisted of 100 men, under Captain Blumenthal. Captain Zittzwitz commanded the rear guard, consisting of the same number; and the rest of the aforesaid regiment, with a squadron of dragoons of Bareith, under Captain Chambaud, followed with the baggage.

General Laudon summoned the Prussians twice, by the sound of the trumpet, to lay down their arms; which they not complying with, he ordered all his cavalry to advance. General Jacquemin fell upon the advanced guard, while General Laudon himself attacked the rear, and the hussars, in platoons, flanked the baggage. The Captains Blumenthal and Zittzwitz formed their small force in a kind of square, from whence they kept a continual fire. The Austrian cavalry nevertheless advanced six times on a gallop, to within ten paces of the Prussians; but perceiving many fall on their side, among whom were several officers, they retreated in great disorder. Afterwards the Croats having taken possession of a wood, between Siebenhausen and Steinau, through which the roads were very bad, and by the rains rendered almost impassable for carriages, they there attacked the Prussians on all sides. Unfortunately a wagon broke down in a defile, and as the Prussians did not think proper to stay to repair it, they were obligated to abandon all that was behind it. By which five covered wagons, laden with baggage, and eighteen carts with meal and oats, fell into the hands of the enemy, who harassed the Prussians as far as Steinau, and were constantly engaged with the rear guard.

== Loss on both sides ==
The loss of the Austrians greatly exceeded the Prussians; they buried above 300 men in different places, and sent 500 wounded to Neustadt. Besides which, the Prussians took 25 prisoners, among whom were several officers. They had 35 men killed, and 4 officers, and 69 private men wounded, in Mantueffel's regiment; as also one lieutenant, with three dragoons, in Bareith's. The enemy made a subaltern officer, two drummers, and 35 private man prisoners; so that the loss of the Prussians, in the whole, including the missing, amounts to about 170 men; which was not much, considering the great superiority of the enemy.

And though General Laudon so far succeeded by this accident, as to make himself master of Neustadt, he found himself in no condition to maintain his ground; but on the 17th, at break of day, he abandoned his acquisition, and retreated to Jägerndorf, with 14 companies of grenadiers, having ordered the Austrian cavalry to march to Freiwaldau.
