= Christian Moritz Graf Königsegg und Rothenfels =

Field Marshal of the Holy Roman Empire

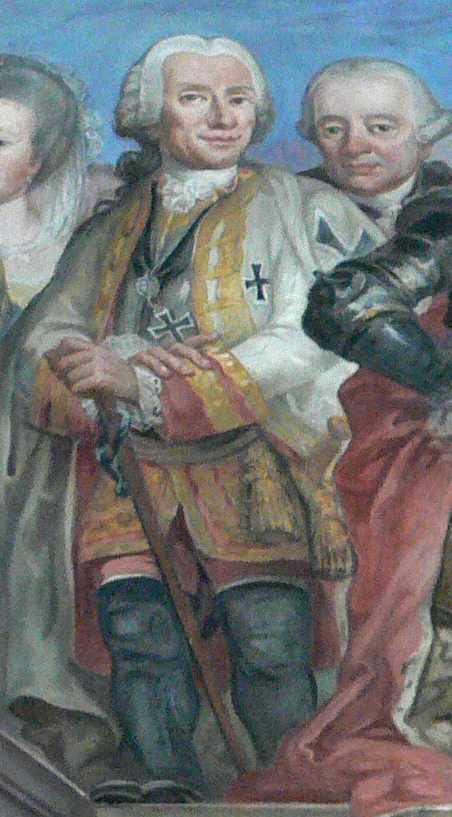
- Christian Moritz von Königsegg-Rothenfels
- Born: November 24, 1705.
- Died: July 21, 1778 (aged 72); Vienna, Holy Roman Empire
- Relatives: Joseph Lothar von Königsegg (uncle)
- Military career
- Allegiance: Holy Roman Empire
- Rank: Field Marshal
- Conflicts: War of Polish Succession; Battle of Guastalla; Austro-Turkish War; War of Austrian Succession; Seven Years' War; Battle of Reichenberg

Count Christian Moritz von Koenigsegg und Rothfels (November 24, 1705 – July 21, 1778 in Vienna) was a field marshal of the Holy Roman Empire.

He went into the military service early and joined the regiment of his uncle, the Field Marshal Joseph Lothar von Königsegg, and would eventually become colonel. In 1734 he fought in the Battle of Guastalla and was wounded. He fought in the wars against the Turks and the War of Austrian Succession. After the Peace of Aachen, he was named Imperial ambassador at the court of the Electorate of Cologne and was promoted to Feldzeugmeister.

In the Seven Years' War he fought in Bohemia and was defeated in the Battle of Reichenberg. Nevertheless, he was appointed Field Marshal in 1758. Being a knight of the Teutonic Order; during his later years he commanded the Bailiwick of Alsace and Burgundy.

== See also ==
- List of field marshals of the Holy Roman Empire
