= Battle of Freiberg =

Battle in 1762 in Germany

Coordinates: 50.9119°N 13.3428°E

- Part of the Third Silesian War (Seven Years' War)
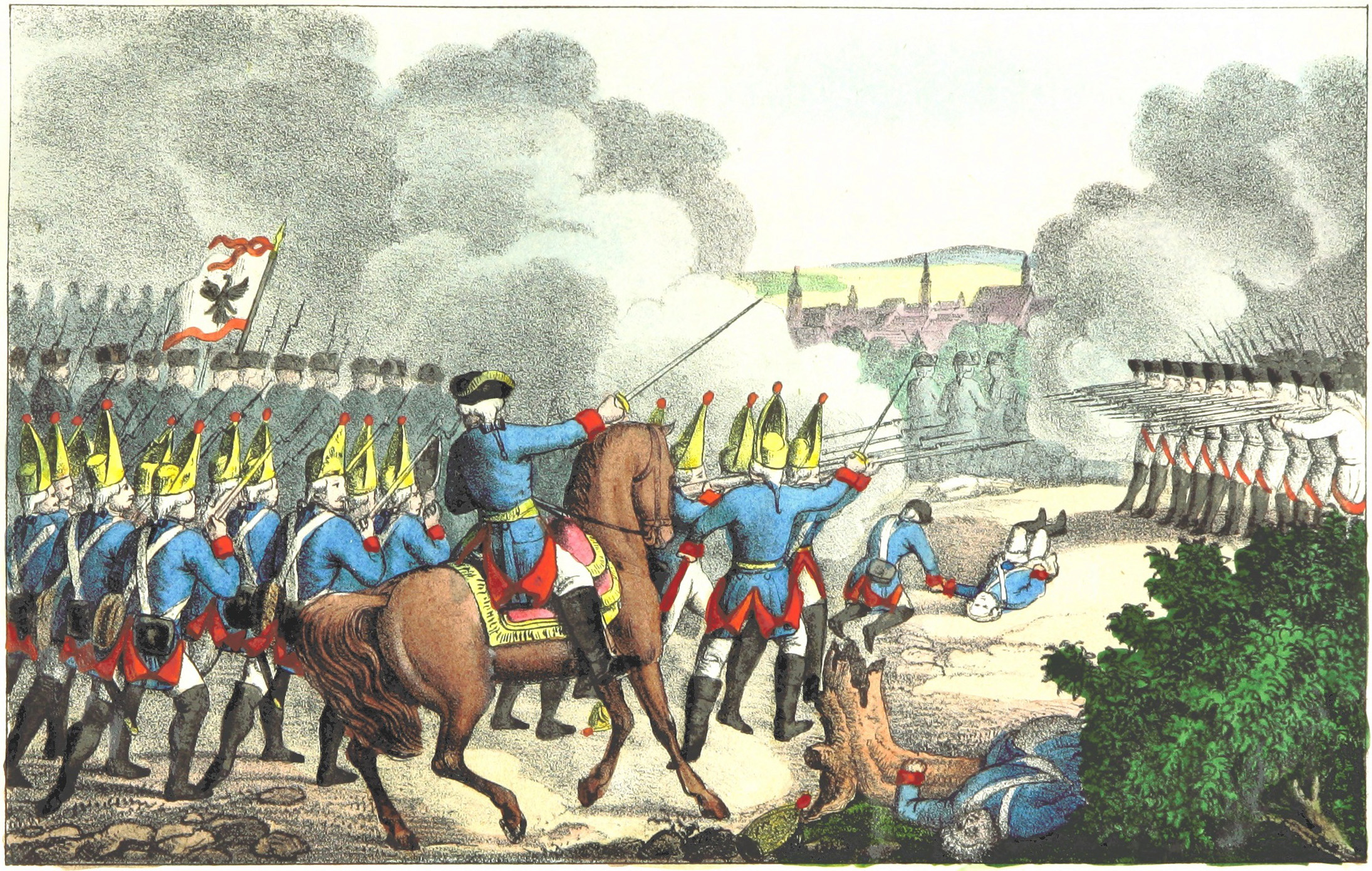
- Battle of Freiberg, 29 October 1762
Date	29 October 1762
Location	Freiberg, Electorate of Saxony
Result	Prussian victory

Belligerents
(Kingdom of Prussia) Prussia	(Habsburg monarchy) Austria

Commanders and leaders
Prince Henry of Prussia	Prince Stolberg; András Hadik

Strength
22,000–22,657	27,000–31,000

Casualties and losses
2,500	8,000

The Battle of Freiberg was fought on 29 October 1762 and was the last great battle of the Third Silesian War (and of the wider Seven Years' War).

== Background ==
Prince Henry of Prussia, younger brother of King Frederick II of Prussia, although commanding an army made up mostly of 'second line' troops and free battalions, decided to take the offensive against the Reichsarmy commanded by Prince Stolberg, who had the support of András Hadik's Austrian Corps. The allies were dug in behind field works on top of high ground to the west of the town of Freiberg. This position blocked all approaches to Dresden. To the rear of the allied position was the River Mulde, which was crossed by several bridges to the east of the town. On 28 October Prince Henry and his staff performed a reconnaissance of the allied position. This was hampered by the Austrian light troops, who occupied the woods in front of the high ground. Henry gathered enough information, however, to form a good picture of the enemy's dispositions.

It was clear to Henry that the main Austrian force, the corps under Campitelli, was securely ensconced on the heights to the south-west of the town, while the Reichsarmy held the heights blocking the western access. Although the front of their position had been strengthened by the construction of several redoubts and abbatis, no force appeared to be protecting the right flank of the allied army, leaving the Reichsarmy troops somewhat 'out on a limb'. This was too tempting a target for the Prince, who planned to pin the Austrians to the south-west with a small detachment while his main army outflanked and defeated the lower quality Reichsarmy. Henry was gambling that the Austrian Corps under Meyer, comfortable behind their entrenchments, would not want to leave their position.

== Battle ==
At dawn on 29 October Prince Henry formed his army on the ground to the west of Lang Hennersdorf, detailing Forcade with the reserve to the north, Kleist to the south to pin Meyer, with Seydlitz and Stutterheim to attack the heights held by the Reichsarmy. As they advanced, the leading elements of the Prussian army skirmished briefly with the Croats in the woods, but these troops soon withdrew in the face of formed infantry. Young Stutterheim's attack, however, met stiff resistance from the corps of Campitelli, and for a time the attack stalled. Several Prussian cavalry attacks also failed to shift the Austrians, and a regiment had to be borrowed from the left wing in order to stabilise this front. While the main Prussian army attacked this position, Seydlitz, finding the ground difficult for his cavalry, took command of the infantry on his wing and attacked Campitelli's flank. With the pressure mounting, Stolberg began to move his line to the south in order to bolster the defence of a hillock known as the Trois Croix. Henry also recognised the importance of this feature and rushed his grenadiers towards it. The Imperial cavalry charged the Prussians, and although driven off with losses, bought enough time for the Reichsarmy grenadiers to take possession of the hill.

Old Stutterheim, never one to stand idly by, noticed the shift of the Reichsarmy southwards and realised that the defenders to his front had been weakened by this move. He ordered his troops to attack without delay, and the Austrian infantry began to crumble. The Prussian Belling Hussars and the Cuirassier Regiment 4 charged through the enemy infantry, who broke and were cut down by the victorious Prussians. With his allies in retreat and his flanks wide open, Stolberg ordered a general retreat. The Reichsarmy withdrew from their positions, followed by the remainder of Campitelli's troops. As predicted, Mayer's corps did not leave their positions to help the rest of their army, Meyer later protesting that he had obeyed orders to hold his position to the last drop of blood. The Prussians lost 1400 men, the allies 7000 men, 9 colours and 28 guns.

== Aftermath ==
The Allies retreated all the way back to Pirna, the Prussians following up cautiously at first and then more boldly. Kleist was detached during the first week in November in order to raid the Austrian magazines in Saxony, which he did, completely destroying them. He then took his footsore soldiers into Franconia, under orders from Henry to upset the Imperialists. Naumberg, Würzburg and Regensburg were taken and 'contributions' were extracted from the ruling princes. Stolberg pleaded in vain with Hadik to be allowed to return and protect his homeland, but unbeknownst to him, Hadik had been in secret talks with King Frederick, and they reached an agreement which led to the disbandment of the Reich's army.

== Bibliography ==
- Clodfelter, M. (2017). Warfare and Armed Conflicts: A Statistical Encyclopedia of Casualty and Other Figures, 1492-2015 (4th ed.). Jefferson, North Carolina: McFarland. ISBN 978-0-7864-7470-7.
