= Friedrich August von Finck =

German general (1718–1766)

Friedrich August von Finck (1718 – February 24, 1766) was a Prussian general and writer.

== Biography ==
Finck was born in Mecklenburg-Strelitz. He first saw active service in 1734 on the Rhine, as a member of the suite of Anton Ulrich, Duke of Brunswick-Wolfenbüttel. Soon after this he transferred to the Austrian service, and thence went to Russia, where he served until the fall of his patron Marshal Burkhard Christoph von Münnich put an end to his prospects of advancement. In 1742 he went to Berlin, and Frederick the Great made him his aide-de-camp, with the rank of major. Good service brought him rapid promotion in the Seven Years' War. After the Battle of Kolin (June 18, 1757) he was made colonel, and at the end of 1757 major-general.

At the beginning of 1759 Finck became lieutenant-general, and in this rank commanded a corps at the disastrous Battle of Kunersdorf, where he did good service both on the field of battle and in the rallying of the beaten Prussians; Frederick eventually having handed over command to him. On September 21 Finck fought, in concert with General Johann Jakob von Wunsch, the Battle of Korbitz, in which the Austrians and the contingents of the minor states of the Empire were defeated. For this action Frederick gave Finck the Order of the Black Eagle.

However the subsequent catastrophe of the Battle of Maxen abruptly put an end to Finck's active career. The Prussians had capitulated Dresden to the Austrians on September 4, and Finck was ordered by the king to Maxen (a village in the Pirna region of Saxony) to cut off the enemy's movement. Being dangerously exposed, and having inadequate forces, Finck accordingly advised the king against such operation but followed his unchanged orders. Cut off and vastly outnumbered, he was forced to surrender with some 14,000 men on November 21, 1759. After the Peace of Hubertusburg, Frederick sent him before a court-martial, which sentenced him to be cashiered. He also was imprisoned for a year in the fortress at Spandau. At the expiry of this term Finck entered Danish service as general of infantry. He died at Copenhagen in 1766, still feeling wronged by Frederick's inexorable rigor.

== Writing ==
Finck left a work called Gedanken über militärische Gegenstände (Berlin, 1788).
