= Siege of Glatz =

Siege during Third Silesian War

Coordinates: 50°26′00″N 16°39′00″E

- Part of the Third Silesian War (Seven Years' War)
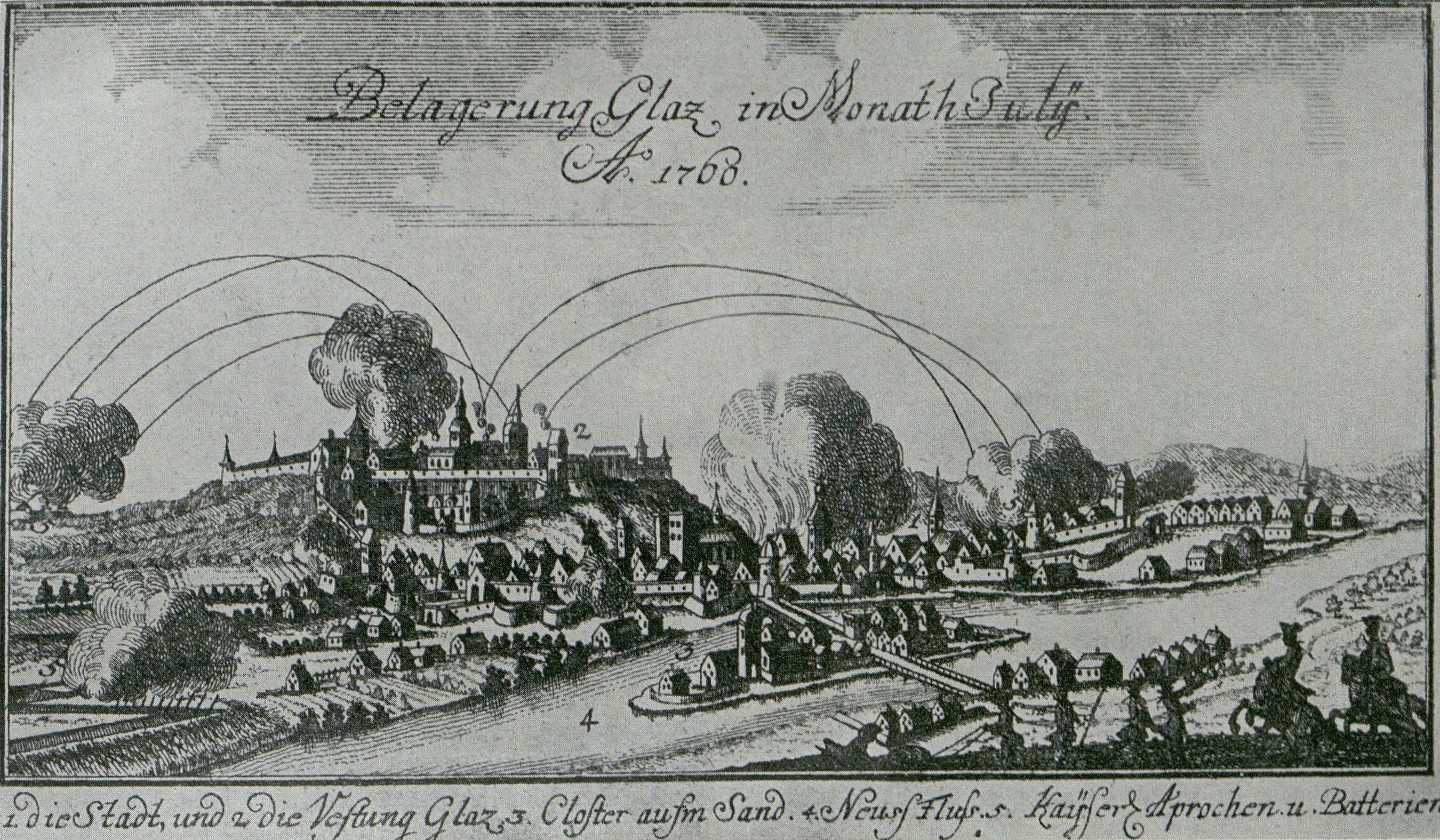
- 18th-century Austrian engraving of the siege
Date	7 June – 26 July 1760
Location	Glatz, Prussian Silesia
Result	Austrian victory

Belligerents
Kingdom of Prussia	(Holy Roman Empire) Austria

Commanders and leaders
Bartholomäus d'O	General von Laudon

Strength
3,200	Unknown

Casualties and losses
700 casualties 2,500 prisoners	214 casualties

The siege of Glatz took place in 1760 during the Third Silesian War (part of the Seven Years' War) when an Austrian force led by General von Laudon laid siege to and successfully stormed the fortress of Glatz (today Kłodzko, Poland) from its Prussian garrison.

On 6 June Laudon surrounded Glatz, but he had to wait until heavy artillery was brought from Olomouc in neighbouring Moravia. While waiting, Laudon received information about the approach of a Prussian force under Fouqué. With his much larger force Laudon moved to intercept the smaller force, forcing Fouqué to surrender at the Battle of Landeshut on 23 June.

Laudon then returned his attentions to the siege of Glatz. The arrival of his heavy artillery had allowed the siege to properly begin on 20 July and a trench had been dug. Once the guns had weakened the defences Laudon was able to organise volunteers to storm the city, opening the gates and allowing the remainder of the Austrian army to enter.

== Aftermath ==
Following a series of extensive manoeuvres and several heavy battles during 1760 Glatz ultimately remained the only territory captured by the Austrian and their allies leaving the situation almost unchanged since a year before.

The Prussian commander Colonel Bartholomäus d'O was taken prisoner by the Austrians. Following his release at the end of the war he was tried and executed by Frederick the Great as a punishment for losing Glatz.
