= John Sigismund Maguire =

Irish-Habsburg military leader

John Sigismund Maguire of Enniskillen
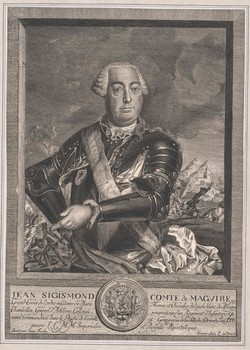
- John Sigismund Maguire of Enniskillen
- Born: 1710; Ballymacelligott, Ireland
- Died: 12 January 1767 (aged 56–57) Opava, Austrian Silesia
- Allegiance: Holy Roman Empire
- Branch: Imperial Army of the Holy Roman Emperor
- Rank: Feldzeugmeister
- Commands: Military Governor of Dresden
- Conflicts: War of the Polish Succession; Russo-Turkish War (1735–1739); War of the Austrian Succession; Seven Years' War: Battle of Lobositz; Battle of Prague; Capture of Dresden; Siege of Dresden
- Awards: Military Order of Maria Theresa (Grand Cross)

John Sigismund Maguire of Enniskillen (German: Johann Sigismund Macquire von Inniskillen; 1710 – 12 January, 1767) was an Irish-born Habsburg general. He is most known for his defence of Dresden in 1760.

== Life ==
John Maguire was born in the parish of Ballymacelligot, County Kerry in 1710. Maguire came from the Maguire Clan of County Fermanagh, which left during the time of the Irish Confederate Wars and settled in Kerry.

He left Ireland and joined the Austrian army; in 1729 he was documented as an ensign in Temesvár and fought in the War of the Polish Succession, and the Russo-Turkish War (1735–1739) and in the War of the Austrian Succession, at times under the command of other Austrian commanders of Irish origin like Field-Marshal Maximilian Ulysses Browne and Lieutenant-General Franz Moritz von Lacy.

In the Seven Years' War he was a Lieutenant Field Marshal and took part in the battles of Lobositz and Prague. He captured the fortress of Sonnenstein in September 1758 after a 3 day siege. He was second in command to Frederick Michael, Count Palatine of Zweibrücken at the capture of Dresden in 1759 and became military governor of the city. For his services he received the Grand Cross of the Military Order of Maria Theresa and was promoted to Feldzeugmeister. In the following year he successfully defended the city when it was besieged by the Prussian King Frederick the Great. Maguire refused the King's request to surrender with the words "that having the honour to have charge of the defences of this city I will defend it to the last man" After the war he was given command of Olmütz.

He died on 12 January 1767 in Troppau, the capital of Austrian Silesia.

== Family ==
He had been married to Elisabeth Louise since 1743. On 24 September 1763 he married Maria Antonia von Blümegen (1742–1785). Both marriages were without issue.

== See also ==
- Irish military diaspora

== Bibliography ==
- Stanard G. William. "The McGuire Family in Virginia". Old Dominion Press (1926) Available at:
