= Battle of Liegnitz =

Three military engagements are known as the Battle of Liegnitz or Battle of Legnica, after the Silesian town of Liegnitz-Legnica, in south-western Poland:

- The Battle of Legnica (1241) was a battle in the Mongol invasion of Europe
- The Battle of Liegnitz (1634) was a battle in the Thirty Years' War
- The Battle of Liegnitz (1760) was a battle in the Seven Years' War
