= Bombardment of Dresden =

Bombardment of Dresden may refer to:

- Siege of Dresden (1760)
- Bombing of Dresden in World War II (1945)
