= Siege of Dresden =

Siege during Third Silesian War

- Part of the Third Silesian War (Seven Years' War)
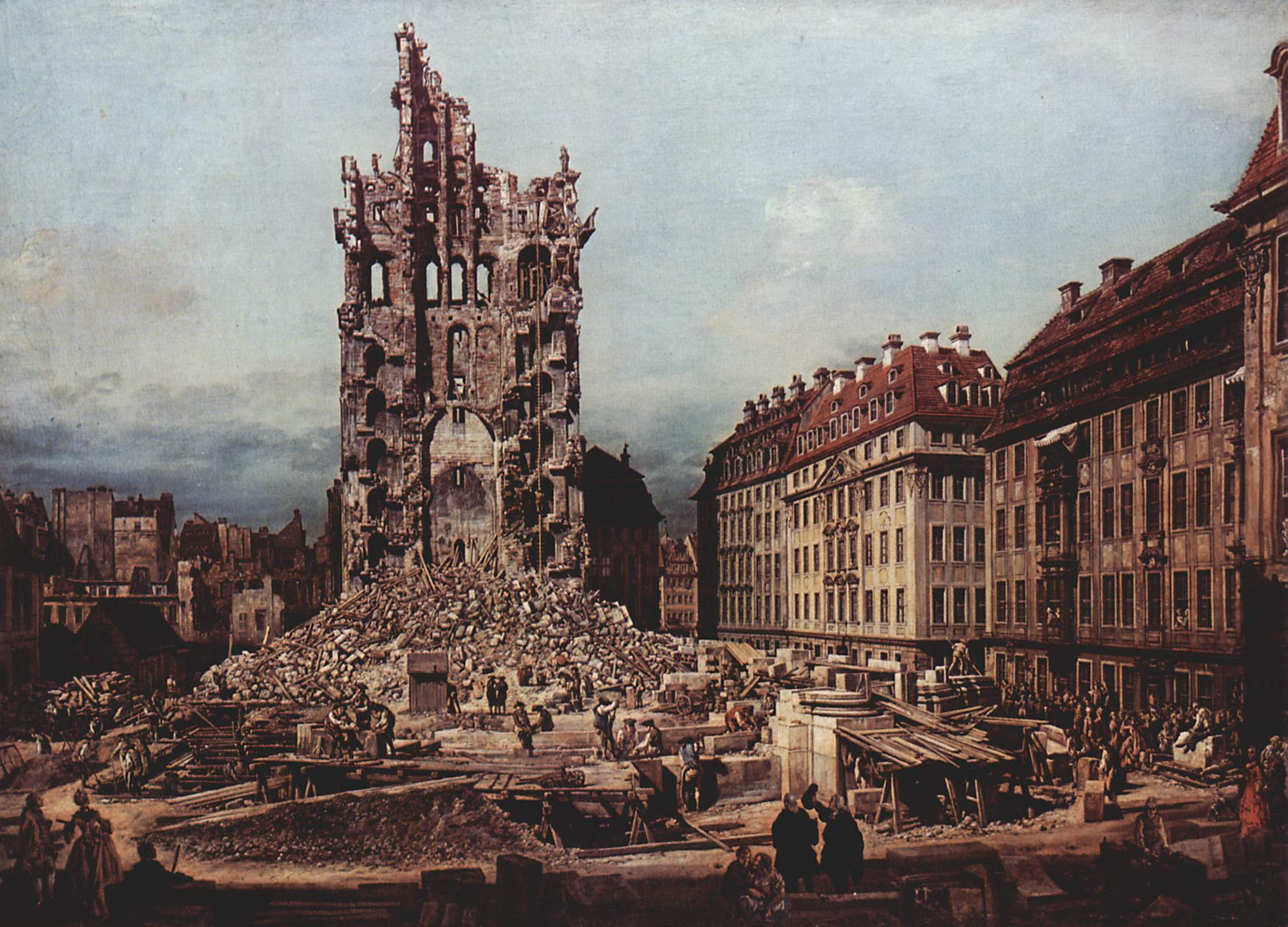
- The ruins of the Kreuzkirche, destroyed by Prussian bombardment. Bernardo Bellotto, oil on canvas, 1765
| Date | 13–22 July 1760 |
| Location | Dresden, Saxony 51.0500°N 13.7333°E |
| Result | Austro-Saxon victory |

Belligerents
| Prussia | (Holy Roman Empire) Austria; Saxony |

Commanders and leaders
| Frederick the Great | John Sigismund Maguire |

Strength
| Unknown | 13,900 |

Frederick the Great
current battle
First Silesian War
Second Silesian War
Third Silesian War

The siege of Dresden took place in July 1760 during the Third Silesian War (part of the Seven Years' War) when a Prussian force led by Frederick the Great unsuccessfully besieged the city of Dresden in Saxony.

Frederick had previously occupied Dresden in 1756 during his Invasion of Saxony, which had triggered the outbreak of war. In 1759 it had been taken back by Austria-led forces. Frederick now targeted it in an attempt to reassert control over Saxony where he had expansionist territorial ambitions.

The Prussian army reached the outskirts of Dresden on 13 July followed closely by a corps of Austrian troops under Count von Lacy. Frederick's forces crossed the River Elbe and overran the suburbs of the city bringing up heavy guns to target inside the city walls. Frederick was accused of deliberately shelling civilian areas of the city.

Deciding to move and confront the threatening army of Daun, Frederick abandoned his attempt to reoccupy the city and withdrew. The large amount of damage done to the city and indiscriminate destruction further damaged Frederick's reputation across much of Europe. In particular, his destruction of the Elector of Saxony's gardens at Pirna in the wake of the siege, drew criticism.

Dresden was the third major siege Frederick had been forced to abandon following Prague (1757) and Olomouc (1758). Frederick's forces crossed into Silesia and fought the Battle of Liegnitz on 15 August.

== Bibliography ==
- Childs, John. Armies and Warfare in Europe, 1648–1789. Manchester University Press, 1982.
- Dull, Jonathan R. The French Navy and the Seven Years' War. University of Nebraska Press, 2005.
- Szabo, Franz A.J. The Seven Years War in Europe, 1757–1763. Pearson, 2008.
