= Battle of Landshut =

Battle of Landeshut may refer to:

- Battle of Landeshut (1760), at Landeshut in Silesia (now Kamienna Góra in Poland) in the Seven Years' War
- Battle of Landshut (1809), at Landshut in Bavaria, between Napoleonic France and the Austrian Empire
