= Ernst Gideon von Laudon =

Austrian general (1717–1790)

Freiherr Ernst Gideon von Laudon
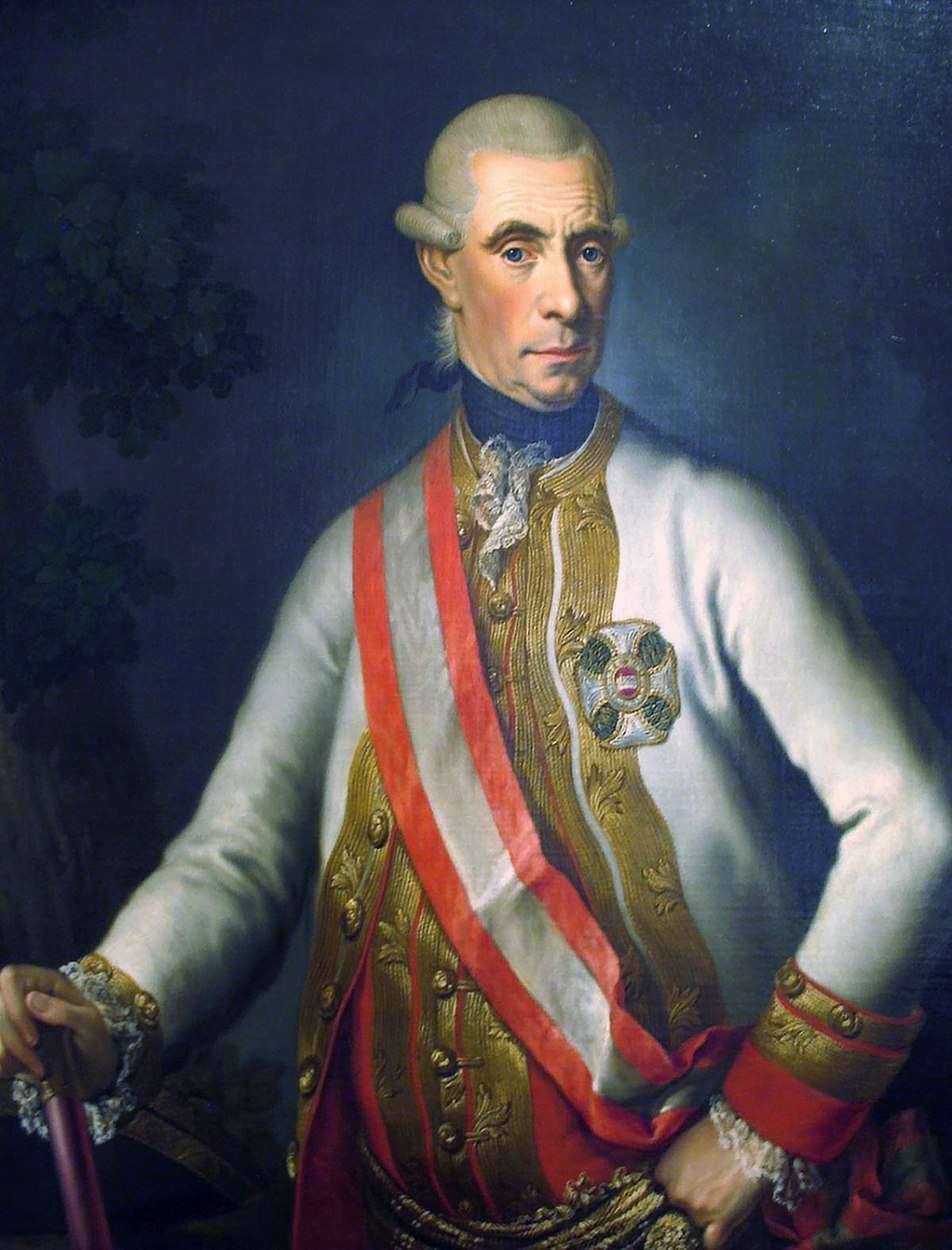
- Portrait, c. 1780
- Born: 13 February 1717; Toce mõisa, Tootzen, Swedish Livonia
- Died: 14 July 1790 (aged 73); Nový Jičín, Moravian Margraviate, Holy Roman Empire
- Burial place: Hadersdorf, Vienna
- Military career
- Allegiance: Russian Empire; Holy Roman Empire (from 1742)
- Branch: Imperial Army
- Service years: 1732–1790
- Rank: Generalfeldmarschall
- Conflicts: War of the Polish Succession; Siege of Danzig; Russo-Turkish War (1735–1739); War of the Austrian Succession; Battle of Soor; Seven Years' War; Battle of Domstadtl; Battle of Hochkirch; Siege of Glatz; Battle of Landeshut; Battle of Kunersdorf; Battle of Liegnitz; War of the Bavarian Succession; Austro-Turkish War (1788–1791); Siege of Belgrade
- Awards: Military Order of Maria Theresa, Knight's Cross and Grand Cross; Russian Honor Sword from Empress Catherine the Great (1760); Bust in the Walhalla (memorial)

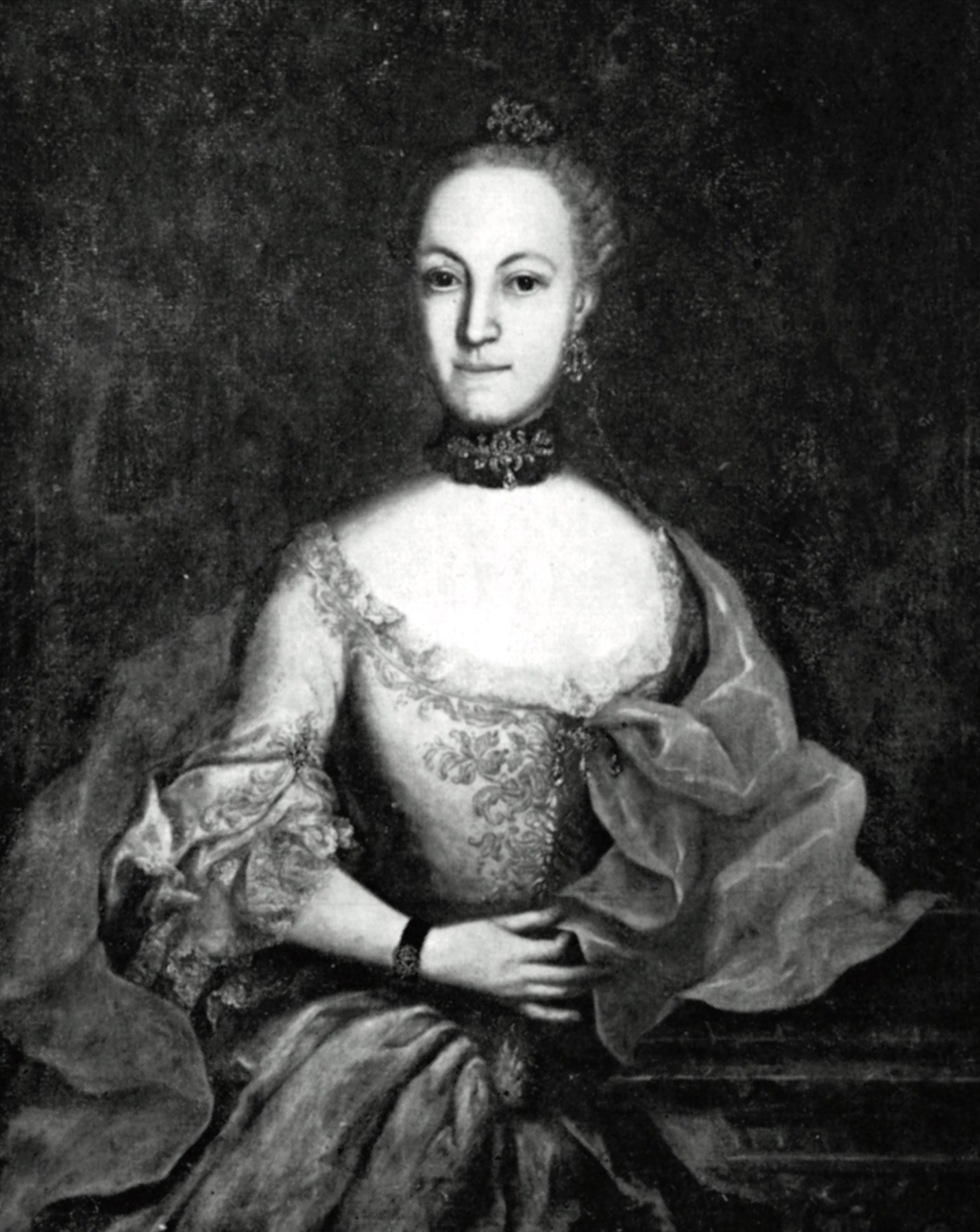
Portrait of Ernst Gideon's wife: Klara von Hagen, Bečváry castle

Ernst Gideon von Laudon, since 1759 Freiherr von Laudon (originally Laudohn or Loudon; 13 February 1717 – 14 July 1790), was an Austrian military officer of Baltic German descent and one of the most successful opponents of the Prussian king Frederick the Great.

Born in Swedish Livonia, which was soon ceded to Russia in the aftermath of the Great Northern War, Laudon joined the Imperial Russian Army in 1732 but became frustrated by its poor conditions and the lack of prospects. He eventually entered Austrian service and distinguished himself during the Second Silesian War against Prussia. The Seven Years' War catapulted Laudon to fame and saw his elevation to Austrian nobility by Empress Maria Theresa. He scored decisive victories over Frederick the Great's Prussian army at Kunersdorf and Landeshut, though his fortunes reversed when Frederick inflicted a major defeat upon him at Liegnitz.

Laudon spent the decades following the peace in a state of semi-retirement. In 1788, despite his advanced age, he was recalled to active service to prosecute the Austro-Turkish War and scored a final victory with the capture of Belgrade. He was later appointed commander-in-chief of the Austrian armed forces by Emperor Leopold II but soon died on duty at the age of 73.

== Background and early career ==
Laudon was the son of Otto Gerhard Ritter von Laudohn (1673–1732), a lieutenant-colonel, retired on a meagre pension from the Swedish service and his wife, Sophie Eleonore von Bornemann (1680–1734). The Laudohn family, of mixed German and Latgalian origin, belonged to the Baltic-German nobility, and had been settled in the estate of Tootzen, near Laudohn in Eastern Livonia (present-day Latvia) before 1432. He claimed a kinship with the Earls of Loudoun from Scotland, which could not be established. As upon the Great Northern War Livonia had been ceded to Russia according to the 1721 Treaty of Nystad, the boy was sent to the Imperial Russian Army as a cadet in 1732. During the War of the Polish Succession he took part in the 1734 Siege of Danzig led by Feldmarschall Burkhard Christoph von Münnich, he marched against French troops up to the Rhine in 1735 and back to the Dnieper River into the Turkish campaign.

After the 1739 Treaty of Belgrade, he returned to the Russian court at Saint Petersburg. Dissatisfied with his prospects and the conditions in the Russian Army, he finally resigned in 1741 and sought military employment elsewhere. He applied first to King Frederick the Great, who however declined his services. At Vienna he had better fortune, being made a captain in the Freikorps of Franz von der Trenck. During the War of the Austrian Succession, he took part in its forays and marches, though not in its atrocities, until wounded and taken prisoner in Alsace. He was shortly released by the advance of the main Austrian army.

== Silesian Wars ==
His next active service, still under Trenck, was in the Silesian mountains in 1745 (during the Second Silesian War against Prussia), in which campaign he greatly distinguished himself as a leader of light troops. He was present also at the Battle of Soor. He retired shortly afterwards, owing to his distaste for the lawless habits of his comrades in the irregulars, and after long waiting in poverty for a regular commission he was at last made a captain in one of the frontier regiments, spending the next ten years in half-military, half-administrative work in the Karlovac district on the Military Frontier. At Bunić, where he was stationed, he built a church and planted an oak forest now called by his name. He had reached the rank of lieutenant-colonel when the outbreak of the Seven Years' War called him again into the field. From this point began his fame as a soldier. At first rejected by General Wilhelm Reinhard von Neipperg, he soon was promoted colonel at the behest of Chancellor Wenzel Anton von Kaunitz-Rietberg and distinguished himself repeatedly. He drew attention at the small but much reported night raid on Ostritz on 1 January 1757 and during that year fought in Bohemia and Saxony under Feldmarschall Maximilian Ulysses Browne and became a Generalfeldwachtmeister (equivalent to major-general) of cavalry as well as a knight of the newly founded Maria Theresa Military Order.

In the Third Silesian War campaign of 1758 came his first opportunity for fighting an action as a commander-in-chief, and he used it so well that Frederick the Great was obliged to give up the siege of Olomouc and retire into Bohemia (Battle of Domstadtl, 30 June). He was rewarded with the grade of lieutenant-field-marshal and having again shown himself an active and daring commander in the campaign of Hochkirch, he was created a Freiherr in the Austrian nobility by Maria Theresa and in the peerage of the Holy Roman Empire by her husband the emperor Francis. Maria Theresa gave him, further, the grand cross of the order she had founded and an estate near Kutná Hora in Bohemia.

He was placed in command of the Austrian contingent sent to join the Russians on the Oder, and participated in Kunersdorf alongside Pyotr Saltykov where a joint Russo-Austrian contingent won a great victory. As a result, Laudon was promoted Feldzeugmeister and made commander-in-chief in Bohemia, Moravia and Silesia. In 1760 he destroyed a whole corps of Frederick's army under Fouqué at the Battle of Landeshut and stormed the important fortress of Glatz. In 1760 he sustained a severe reverse at Frederick's hands in the Battle of Liegnitz (15 August 1760), which action led to bitter controversy with Daun and Lacy, the commanders of the main army, who, Laudon claimed, had left his corps unsupported. In 1761 he operated, as usual, in Silesia, but he found his Russian allies as timid as they had been after Kunersdorf, and all attempts against Frederick's entrenched camp of Bunzelwitz failed. He brilliantly seized his one fleeting opportunity, however, and stormed Schweidnitz on the night of September 30/October 1, 1761. His tireless activity continued to the end of the war, in conspicuous contrast with the temporizing strategy of Counts Leopold Josef von Daun and Franz Moritz von Lacy. The student of the later campaigns of the Seven Years' War will probably admit that there was need of more aggressiveness than Daun displayed, and of more caution than suited Laudon's genius. But neither recognized this, and the last three years of the war are marked by an ever-increasing friction between the "Fabius" and the "Marcellus," as they were called, of the Austrian army.

== Later career ==
After the peace, therefore, when Daun became the virtual commander-in-chief of the army, Laudon fell into the background. Offers were made, by Frederick the Great amongst others, to induce Laudon to transfer his services elsewhere. Laudon did not entertain these proposals, although negotiations went on for some years, and on Lacy succeeding Daun as president of the Council of War, Laudon was made inspector-general of infantry. Dissensions, however, continued between Laudon and Lacy, and on the accession of Joseph II, who was intimate with his rival, Laudon retired to his estate Bečváry near Kutná Hora.

Maria Theresa and Kaunitz caused him, however, to be made commander-in-chief in Bohemia and Moravia in 1769. This post he held for three years, and at the end of this time, contemplating retirement from the service, he settled again on his estate. Maria Theresa once more persuaded him to remain in the army, and, as his estate had diminished in value owing to agrarian troubles in Bohemia, she repurchased it from him, in 1776, on generous terms. Laudon then settled at Hadersdorf near Vienna, and shortly afterwards was made a field-marshal. Of this Carlyle (Frederick the Great) records that when Frederick the Great met Laudon in 1776 he deliberately addressed him in the emperor's presence as "Herr Feldmarschall", but the hint was not taken until February 1778.

In 1778 came the War of the Bavarian Succession. Joseph and Lacy were now reconciled to Laudon and Laudon and Lacy commanded the two armies in the field. On this occasion, however, Laudon seems to have in a measure fallen below his reputation, while Lacy, who was opposed to Frederick's own army, earned new laurels.

For two years after this Laudon lived quietly at Hadersdorf. A new war, with Turkey, broke out in 1787. The generals charged with prosecuting this war did badly, and Laudon was called for the last time into the field. Though old and broken in health, he was commander-in-chief in fact as well as in name, and in 1789 he won a last brilliant success by capturing Belgrade in three weeks. He served the position of military governorship of Habsburg Serbia from his capture of Belgrade until his death while cooperating with the resistance fighters of Koča Anđelković.

He died within the year, at Nový Jičín (Neu-Titschein) in Moravia, still on duty. His last appointment was that of commander-in-chief of the armed forces of Austria, which had been created for him by the new emperor Leopold. Laudon was buried in the grounds of Hadersdorf. Eight years before his death the emperor Joseph had erected a marble bust of Laudon in the chamber of the council of war.

His nephew Johann Ludwig Alexius von Loudon (1762–1822) fought in the Revolutionary and Napoleonic Wars with credit, and rose to the rank of Feldmarschall-Leutnant.

== Personal life ==
Loudon was married in Bösing to Clara von Hagen, the daughter of an Officer serving in Croatia and a relative of the Salviati family. Before their marriage, she has served as chambermaid to Countess Charlotte of Solms-Sonnewalde (1725–1783), wife of Count Christian August von Seilern und Aspang (1717–1801), Governor of the Archduchy of Austria. He had to abduct his future wife because the family opposed the match. No children survived from this marriage.

== Gallery ==
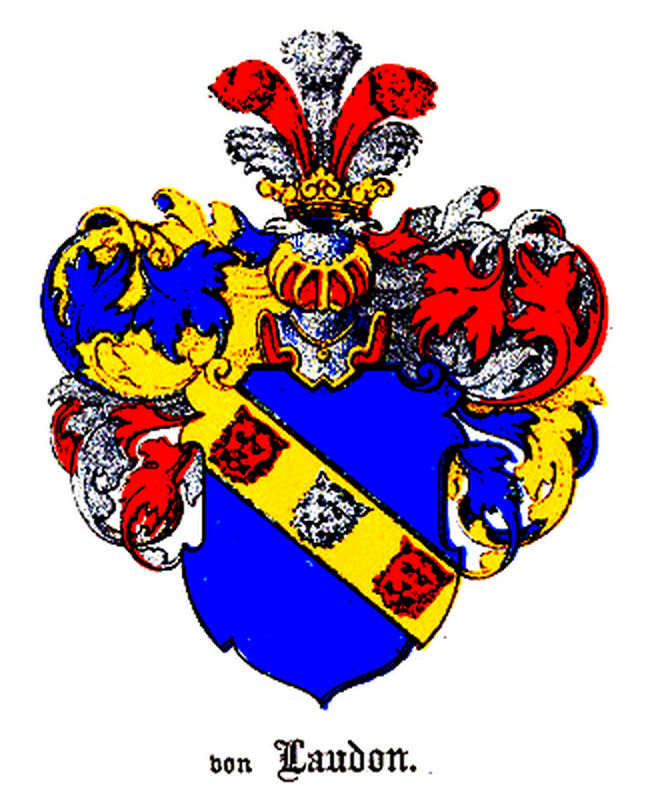
Coat of arms of the Laudon family, in the Baltic-German Coat of arms book by Carl Arvid von Klingspor in 1882.

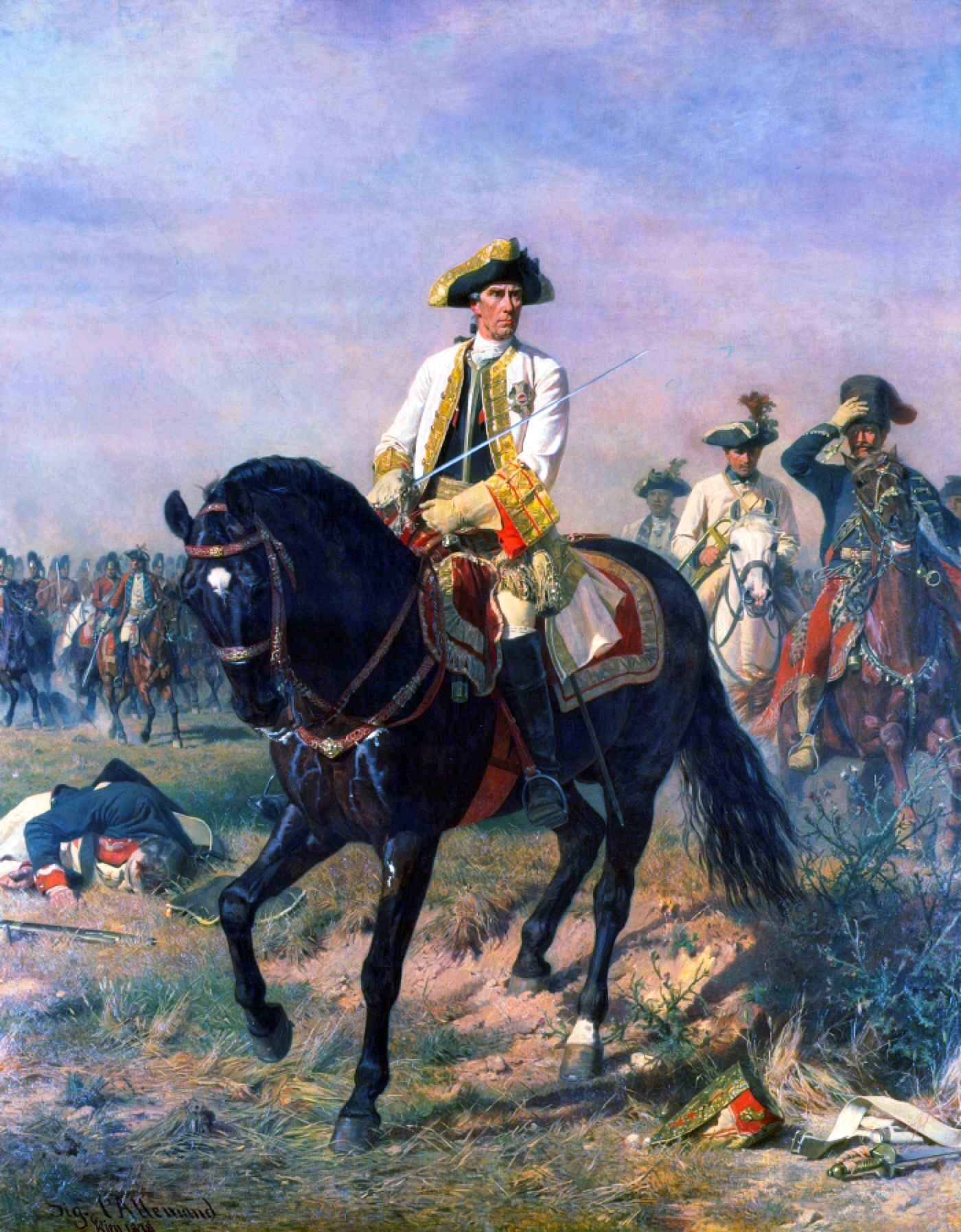
Laudon in victory pose at the Battle of Kunersdorf, 1878 portrait by Siegmund L'Allemand

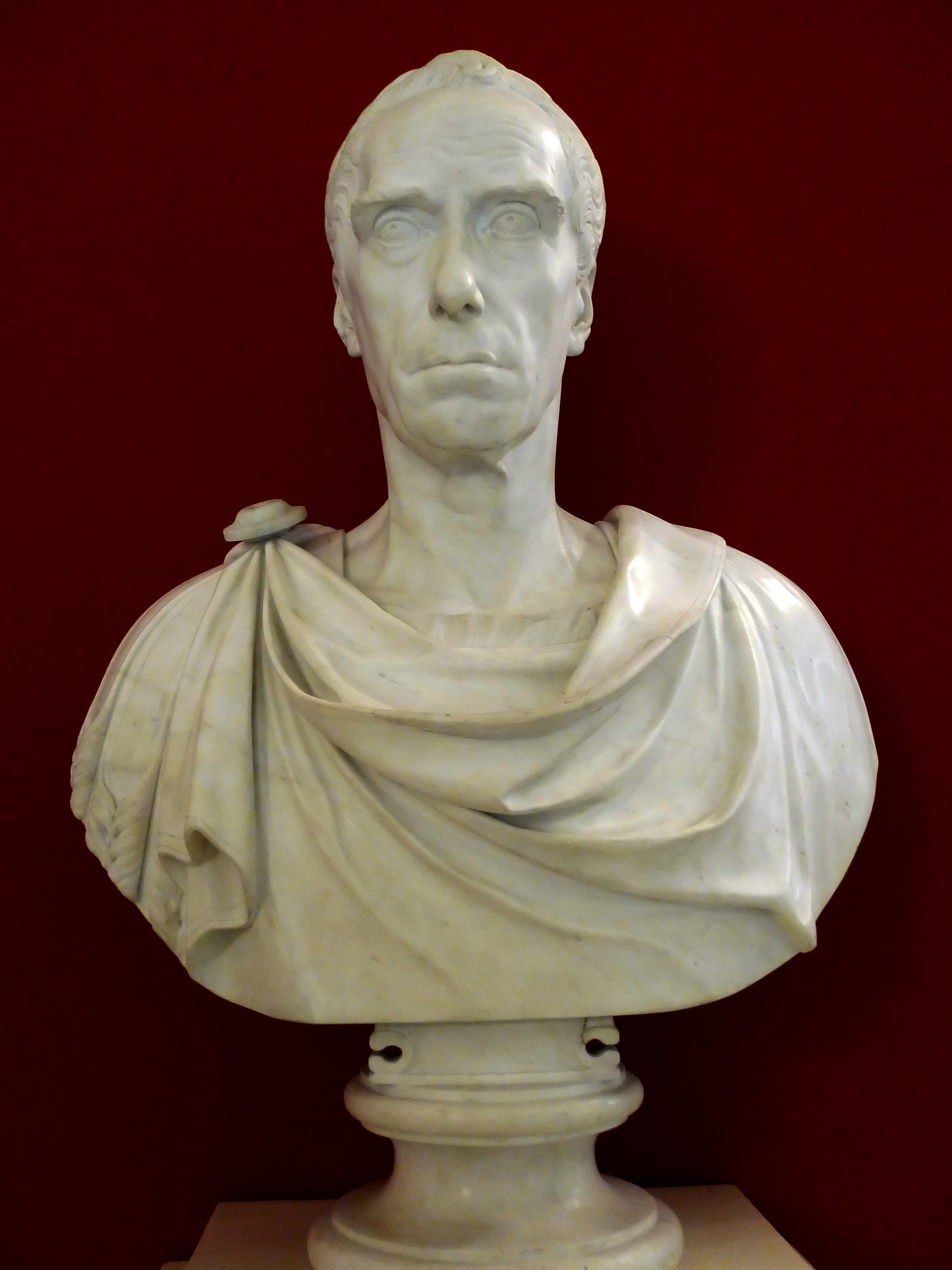
Marble bust by Giuseppe Ceracchi

== Notes ==
The first battleship of the Ersatz Monarch class of the Austro-Hungarian Navy (officially known as Schiff VIII) was to be named Laudon. The ship was never completed due to the outbreak of World War I which interrupted all major warship construction in Austria-Hungary.

The phrase fix Laudon is a light curse sometimes used in Austria. It is said that it was first uttered by Maria Theresa upon her hearing of the loss of Silesia to Frederick the Great.

== Sources ==
- "Лаудон, Гедеон" . Brockhaus and Efron Encyclopedic Dictionary (in Russian). 1906.
