= Heinrich August de la Motte Fouqué =

German general (1698–1774)

Baron Heinrich August de la Motte Fouqué
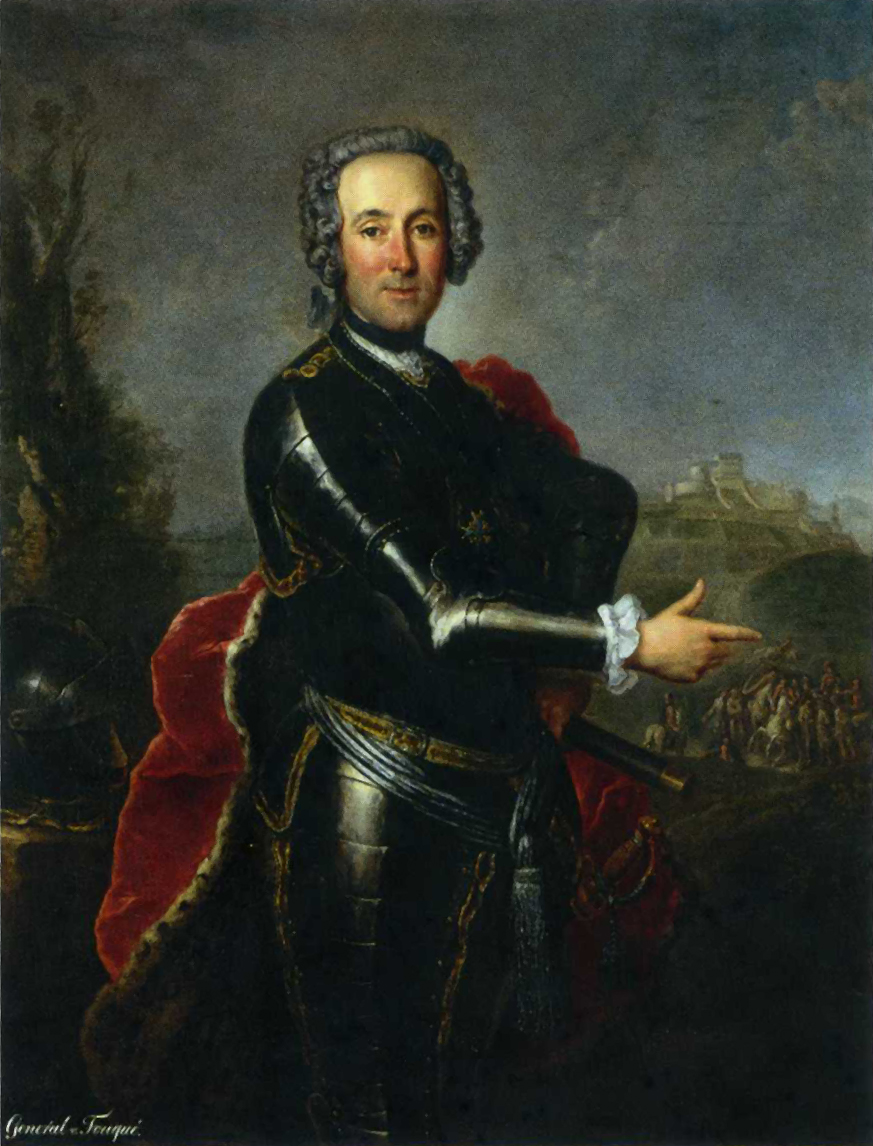
- Painting of Heinrich August de la Motte Fouqué by Antoine Pesne
- Born: February 4, 1698; The Hauge, Dutch Republic
- Died: May 3, 1774 (aged 76); Brandenburg, Kingdom of Prussia
- Spouse: Elisabeth Masson
- Military career
- Allegiance: Kingdom of Prussia Kingdom of Denmark
- Rank: General der Infanterie
- Nickname: Chastity
- Awards: De la Générosité Pour le Mérite Order of the Black Eagle

Ernst Heinrich August de la Motte Fouqué (4 February 1698 – 3 May 1774) was a Prussian Lieutenant General and General der Infanterie and a confidant of King Frederick the Great. Fouqué held the title of Freiherr (baron).

== Early life ==
Born in The Hague to an old Norman family, Fouqué was the second son of Huguenot nobleman Charles de la Motte Fouqué and Susanne de Robillard, who had emigrated from France as a result of the revocation of the Edict of Nantes.

After Fouqué's father died suddenly on October 20, 1701, the family moved to the town of Celle. Fouqué's older brother Charles decided to enlist in the Royal Saxon Army when he reached the eligible age. In 1706, Fouqué became a page at the court of Leopold I, Prince of Anhalt-Dessau. His younger brother Karl also became a page in the court of George I, the elector of the Electorate of Hanover and later the king of the United Kingdom.

== Friendship with Frederick the Great ==
Fouqué became close friends with the prince Frederick II as he spent more time with the king Frederick William I. He was one of the few people given permission from the king to visit the prince while he was restricted to the fortress in Küstrin. Fouqué was a common guest of Frederick's at Rheinsberg. Frederick nicknamed his friend 'Chastity', and Fouqué was allegedly one of the best actors at the Prussian court. Frederick formed the "Bayard Order" to study warfare. Fouqué was the grand master of the gatherings, at which archaic French was used.

== Prussian military career ==
=== Early years ===
In 1715, Fouqué asked Leopold I if he could accompany the prince to the front where Prussia was helping with the Siege of Stralsund. The prince told Fouqué no, and that he had to stay with the princess. Fouqué, determined to experience the excitement of war, snuck off and accompanied the prince and his soldiers. After seeing a soldier fall to gunfire, he picked up the fallen soldier's rifle and began to fire back at the enemy. This was his first time ever participating in battle, and he was made an officer in the Prussian Army for his bravery by the prince.

As a cadet in the 3rd Infantry Regiment of Halle, Fouqué took part in the Prussian campaign in Vorpommern. He was promoted to Premier-Leutnant on March 8, 1719, to Stabskapitän in 1723, to Hauptmann on February 21, 1729, and then to Major in 1738. He was awarded the De la Générosité in 1725 by Frederick William I after being recommended by Leopold I.

After a dispute with Leopold over his lack of promotion, Fouqué left Prussia to enter Danish service in 1738 where he was stationed in Copenhagen. Frederick II supported Fouqué's decision, although he was sad to see his friend go. When Frederick II acceded to the throne in 1740, he induced Fouqué's return by promoting him to Oberst on July 26, making him commander of the newly created Füsilier-Regiments Nr. 37, and awarding him the Pour le Mérite.

=== First Silesian War ===
In the early stage of the First Silesian War, Fouqué commanded a detachment that participated in the capture of the city Schweidnitz. After the city officially recognized Prussian rule on August 20, 1741, Fouqué was tasked with leading a grenadier battalion in Moravia. They helped take over the fortified city of Olmütz. After the city fell, they began conquering a series of towns like Fulnek and Neutitschein, before reaching Kremsier where they helped crush a Wallachian peasant revolt and waited out the winter. Fouqué was ordered to march his troops to help reinforce Olmütz on April 14, 1742, dealing with several small attacks along the way. He reached the city while only sustaining a few casualties. However, Leopold I was ordered by the king to leave the city and retreat back to Silesia. The lack of fortifications in the outer perimeter and constant bombardment from heavy artillery made it too difficult to hold.

In May of 1742, Fouqué's battalion marched into Bohemia under the command of cavalry general Hans Joachim von Zieten and reached the town of Tschaslau where he got to see his friend the king for the first time in almost two years. He was given several minor military assignments in and around the town. Fouqué was ordered to try to march to Chrudim to help Zieten intercept Franz Leopold von Nádasdy and his men who were advancing through the area and attacking Prussian forces. However, they failed to reach Nádasdy in time as he had already cleared the area and marched onto to Deutschbrod.

=== Governor of Glatz ===
Fouqué was named Governor of Glatz in the summer of 1742. The Calvinist dealt ruthlessly with Austrian irregulars in the Catholic County of Glatz, hanging many of them and leaving their bodies swinging on the side of highways. Fouqué also punished anyone who did not follow his orders with severity. Promoted to Generalmajor on May 13, 1743, he was named commander of the Infanterie-Regiment Nr. 33 a year later. Fouqué guarded Friedrich von der Trenck at the prison of Glatz after Trenck was imprisoned by the king for suspecting him of being an Austrian spy. Trenck tried to escape several times and got stuck in a sewer for several hours during one attempt. The adventurer finally succeeded in 1746. Frederick II promoted Fouqué to Generalleutnant on January 23, 1751, and he received the Order of the Black Eagle on September 2 of that same year. When Fouqué received his Black Eagle he recommended that the king also give one to Karl Christoph von der Goltz, and the king agreed that Goltz was worthy.

Fouqué ordered the hanging of the Catholic priest Andreas Faulhaber for allegedly inciting Glatz's Catholic conscripts to desert. Faulhaber was hung on December 30, 1757. A Catholic deserter told Prussian officials that he told Faulhaber in confession that he wanted to desert. The deserter implied that Faulhaber encouraged his desertion, however he later retracted this statement several times. Faulhaber refused to tell Prussian officials what was said during confession. When Faulhaber was brought out to be hanged, he was given one last chance to tell them everything. It is reported that he put his finger over his mouth, and then walked up to the rope.

=== Seven Years' War ===
Fouqué's first major engagement in the Seven Years' War was on September 19, 1756, where he advanced into Bohemia along with Kurt Christoph Graf von Schwerin's troops. After over a month of fighting, on October 27, Fouqué was ordered to return to Lower Silesia where he waited out the winter and commanded the forces stretching from Glatz to Breslau. During this time the regiments he commanded cleared the county of Glatz of all Austrian troops. Once winter ended, Fouqué and Schwerin's troops met up with the king and his men near Prague on May 6, 1757 mere hours before the Battle of Štěrboholy began. Fouqué was stationed on the left wing of the northern frontline with Schewerin who was in command of the entire left wing. During this battle Schwerin was struck by a grapeshot and died near Brandýs nad Labem-Stará Boleslav, as a result of his death his troops came under the control of Fouqué as they kept pushing the enemy down the sloped meadows and into the area near the fish ponds. The Austrians sensed a moment of weakness in the Prussians and began to push them back. However this aggressive push left a gap open in the Austrian frontline for the Prussian infantry to exploit where they were gradually able to outflank the Austrians behind them. Fouqué's hand was injured after it was shot during this aggressive push. The musket ball also shattered his sword's hilt since it was in his hand when he was shot. He returned to his post as the head of the army's left wing after having a fallen soldier's sword tied to his wounded hand, then led one final attack as the Prussians behind the Austrians began to outflank them. The Austrians were soundly defeated and the Prussian cavalry dealt with the retreating men. This injury took Fouqué out of combat for a few months until September 7, when he took control of the fallen general Hans Karl von Winterfeldt's troops after the heavily outnumbered Winterfeldt was defeated and died in the Battle of Moys. On September 20, Fouqué was ordered to retreat back to Glatz to deal with Austrian troops who were trying to push their way back into Lower Silesia.

After Austria's troops began retreating from much of Lower Silesia, Fouqué left Glatz on December 15, 1757 and met up with general Zieten who was chasing the retreating enemy to Landeshut and took control of his men. They overran the troops who were stationed in Landeshut and forced them to retreat out of Lower Silesia. Over 300 infantry men and a few officers were taken prisoner. Fouqué then led his troops to Schweidnitz where he was in charge of the blockade of the city until March 7, 1758. Afterwards, he had to leave to go stop a force of 6,000 Austrians who were advancing into Lower Silesia near Glatz. Fouqué and his men reached Habelschwerdt on March 21 and overran the Austrians in just a few hours, they then returned to Glatz.

Frederick II ordered Fouqué to move his men to Olmütz where he was to help field marshal James Francis Edward Keith with the siege of the city. The Prussians could not crack the Austrian defenses and their progress came to a halt. During the fighting on July 14, a cannonball was dropped on Fouqué's foot which caused bruising and swelling. The men transporting supplies that was intended to reach the Prussian troops in Olmütz were attacked by the Austrians who looted everything. This caused Fouqué's and Keith's men to run dangerously low on supplies, which made any prospect of victory impossible. Frederick II lifted the siege and ordered the Prussian troops to retreat out of Moravia and back to Landeshut.

Frederick II ordered Fouqué to guard Silesia against enemy attacks with eleven battalions and ten squadrons, numbering only 13,000 troops. The opposing army led by Ernst Gideon von Laudon on the other hand had an estimated 33,000 troops. Fouqué initially defended Landeshut rather well, which forced the Austrians to focus more attention on sieging the city of Nyse. Fouqué arrived near Nyse to reinforce the king's men which forced the Austrians to lift the siege without much difficulty. Fouqué and his men went back to Upper Silesia to take up winter quarters, while he sent generals Goltz and Paul von Werner to reinforce the men being besieged in Cosel where they helped drive off the Austrians. On July 23, the Austrians began their attack on Landeshut and the Battle of Landeshut began. Fouqué and his men were able to slow the down the Austrian's push for only a few hours, and as their supplies ran low, the Austrians began to completely encircle and overrun them. The Prussians fought until they completely ran out of ammunition. Over three quarters of Fouqué's men were either killed or captured, and Fouqué himself was also wounded and captured.

Fouqué was slashed three times with swords after Austrian soldiers shot his horse and then rushed him while he was on the ground. Fouqué would have died if not for his hostler, Trautschke, who alerted the Austrian dragoons that they were attacking a commanding officer. Trautschke himself was slashed thirteen times, later had to undergo trepanning, and suffered from long term brain damage. Lieutenant Fronck and Captain von Eichbeck temporarily bandaged the wounds of Fouqué and Trautschke. When the dragoon leader Colonel Voit arrived as Fouqué was regaining consciousness, Voit offered him his horse and sword. Fouqué stated, "I might soil the fine saddle with my blood," to which Voit responded, "My saddle can only gain from being stained by the blood of a hero.". When Frederick heard about Fouqué's capture and behavior, he stated, "Fouqué behaved like a Roman.", and compared his stand against overwhelming odds to that of the last stand between the Spartans led by Leonidas I and the Persians at the Battle of Thermopylae. He was first taken to Hradec Králové, then to Brno, and finally to Bruck an der Leitha where he was given a place to live until the war ended. Fouqué's daughter, oldest son and granddaughters all came to live with him until the war was over.

== Retirement ==
Fouqué was released from Austrian captivity in 1763 when the war ended. Fouqué initially returned to Glatz where there was a small celebration of his return, however he was ordered shortly after to come to Potsdam by the king. He received a hero's welcome by the king and spent the next 4 weeks in the king's palace. During this time he asked to be released from military service, the king refused initially and Fouqué took a 4 month vacation in Brandenburg an der Havel. During this time Fouqué told the king that he was losing function in his legs and arms, and that he was no longer fit for anything but a "hermit's life". The king then told Fouqué to take as much as time as he liked to recover, and that he loved him.

Fouqué was entrusted with supervising the creation of the Kriegsschule(Knight Academy) in Berlin, and later was the head of the school. Fouqué helped create the curriculum, which involved mandating the teaching of French to all students. During his free time while he still had some mobility, Fouqué liked to hunt.

Fouqué died in Brandenburg, his biography was written by his grandson, Friedrich de la Motte Fouqué.

== Personal life ==
In 1733 Fouqué married Elisabeth Masson, who descended from a Huguenot refugee family like himself. Although she was from a poor commoner family unlike Fouqué. They had 8 children together, however only 3 survived into adulthood. The oldest surviving child Heinrich August Karl reached the rank of Premier-Leutnant in the Prussian Army. Karl was also a canon in the Halvberg Cathedral. Fouqué's only surviving daughter was Henriette Augustine Wilhelmine who married a Prussian colonel. His last child Heinrich August Friedrich Louis reached the rank of Hauptmann in the Prussian Army.
