= Fouqué =

Fouqué is a surname. Notable people with the surname include:

- Heinrich August de la Motte Fouqué (1698–1774), Prussian general
- Friedrich de la Motte Fouqué (1777–1843), Prussian writer
- Ferdinand André Fouqué (1828–1904), French geologist and petrologist
