= Domašov nad Bystřicí =

- Municipality
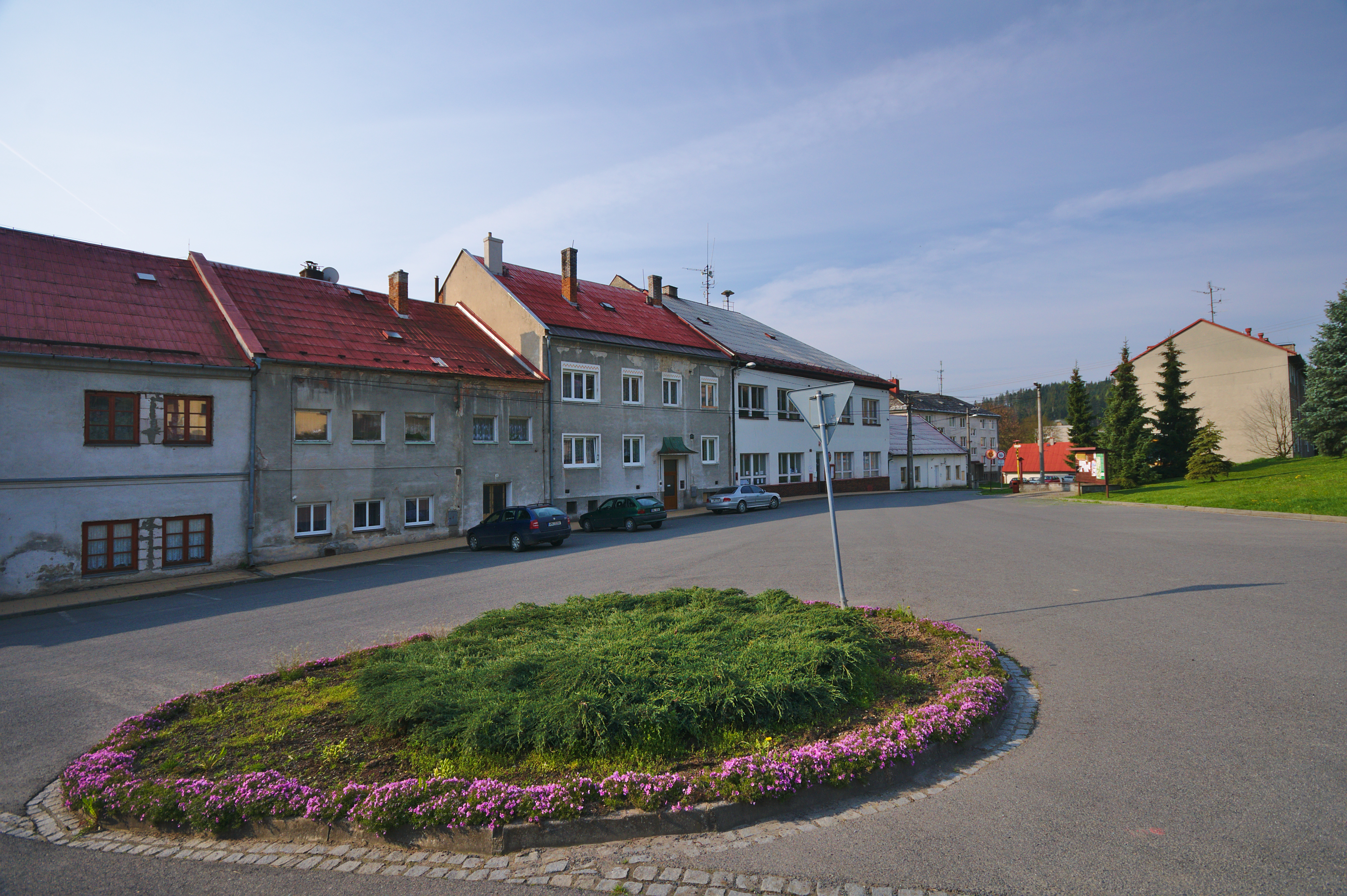
- Centre of Domašov nad Bystřicí

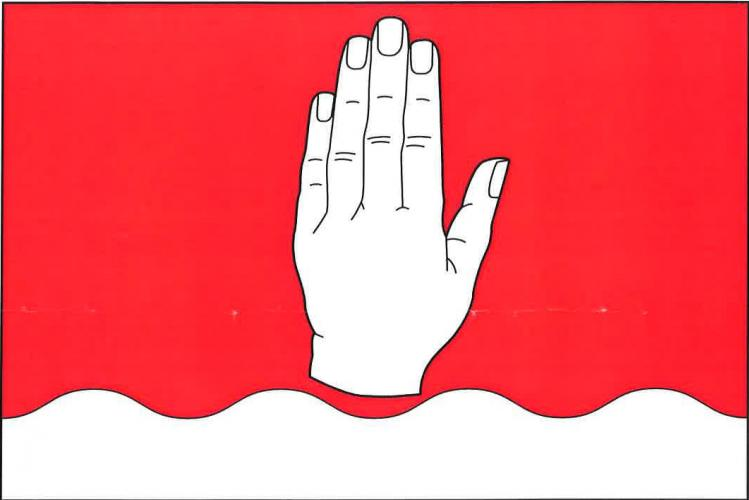
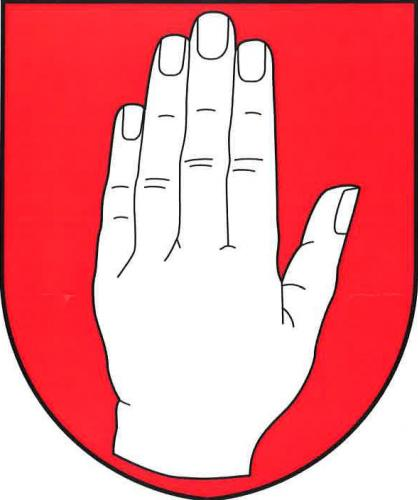
- Flag Coat of arms

- Location in the Czech Republic
- Coordinates: 49°44′32″N 17°26′43″E
- Country: Czech Republic
- Region: Olomouc
- District: Olomouc
- First mentioned: 1274

Area
  - Total: 15.97 km^{2} (6.17 sq mi)
- Elevation: 510 m (1,670 ft)

Population (2026-01-01)
  - Total: 487
  - Density: 30.5/km^{2} (79.0/sq mi)
- Time zone: UTC+1 (CET)
  - Summer (DST): UTC+2 (CEST)
- Postal code: 783 06
- Website: www.domasovnadbystrici.cz

Domašov nad Bystřicí (Czech pronunciation: [ˈdomaʃof ˈnad bɪstr̝̊ɪtsiː]; German: Domstadtl) is a municipality and village in Olomouc District in the Olomouc Region of the Czech Republic. It has about 500 inhabitants.

== Geography ==
Domašov nad Bystřicí is located about 21 kilometres (13 mi) northeast of Olomouc. It lies in the Nízký Jeseník range. The highest point is the hill Hamberk at 640 m (2,100 ft) above sea level. The Bystřice River flows through the municipality.

== History ==
The first written mention of Domašov nad Bystřicí is from 1274. The Battle of Domstadtl of the Seven Years' War took place near the village in 1758.

In 1938, after the Munich Agreement, the municipality was occupied by Germany and administered as part of the Reichsgau Sudetenland. During World War II, the German administration operated the E159 forced labour subcamp of the Stalag VIII-B/344 prisoner-of-war camp at the local quarry. The German-speaking population was expelled in 1945 according to the Beneš decrees.

== Demographics ==
Historical population

| Year | Pop. | ±% |
|---|---|---|
| 1869 | 1,004 | — |
| 1880 | 1,068 | +6.4% |
| 1890 | 1,185 | +11.0% |
| 1900 | 1,204 | +1.6% |
| 1910 | 1,284 | +6.6% |

| Year | Pop. | ±% |
|---|---|---|
| 1921 | 1,173 | −8.6% |
| 1930 | 1,149 | −2.0% |
| 1950 | 754 | −34.4% |
| 1961 | 741 | −1.7% |
| 1970 | 624 | −15.8% |

| Year | Pop. | ±% |
|---|---|---|
| 1980 | 500 | −19.9% |
| 1991 | 461 | −7.8% |
| 2001 | 480 | +4.1% |
| 2011 | 480 | +0.0% |
| 2021 | 450 | −6.2% |

Source: Censuses

== Transport ==
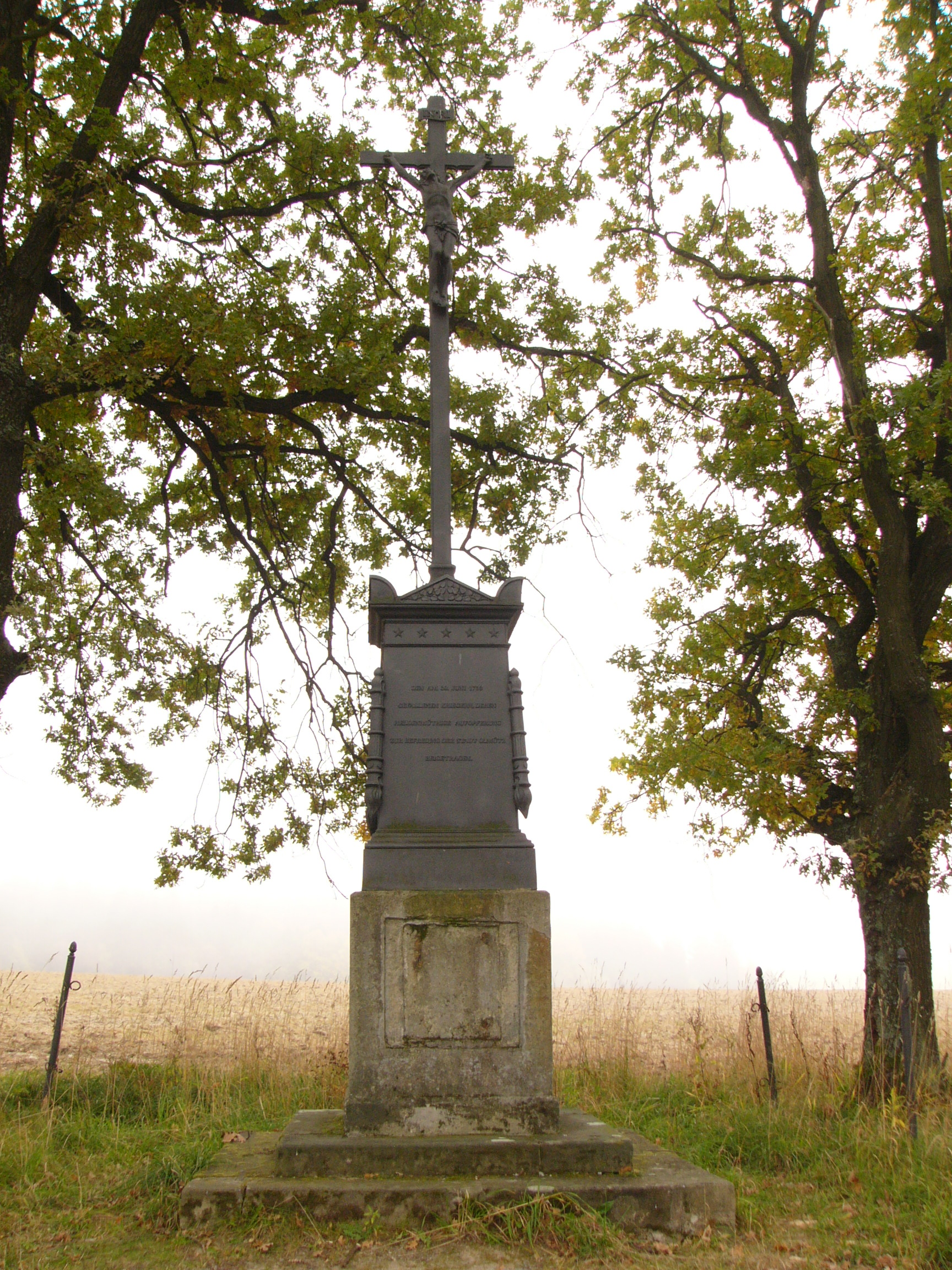
Memorial to the Battle of Domstadtl

Domašov nad Bystřicí is located on the railway line Ostrava–Olomouc.

== Sights ==
The main landmark of Domašov nad Bystřicí is the Church of Saint Anne. It was built in the Neoclassical style in 1791. The church has only local significance and is not protected as a cultural monument. The only protected cultural monument in the municipality is the memorial to the Battle of Domstadtl, dating from 1858.
