= Bečváry =

- Municipality
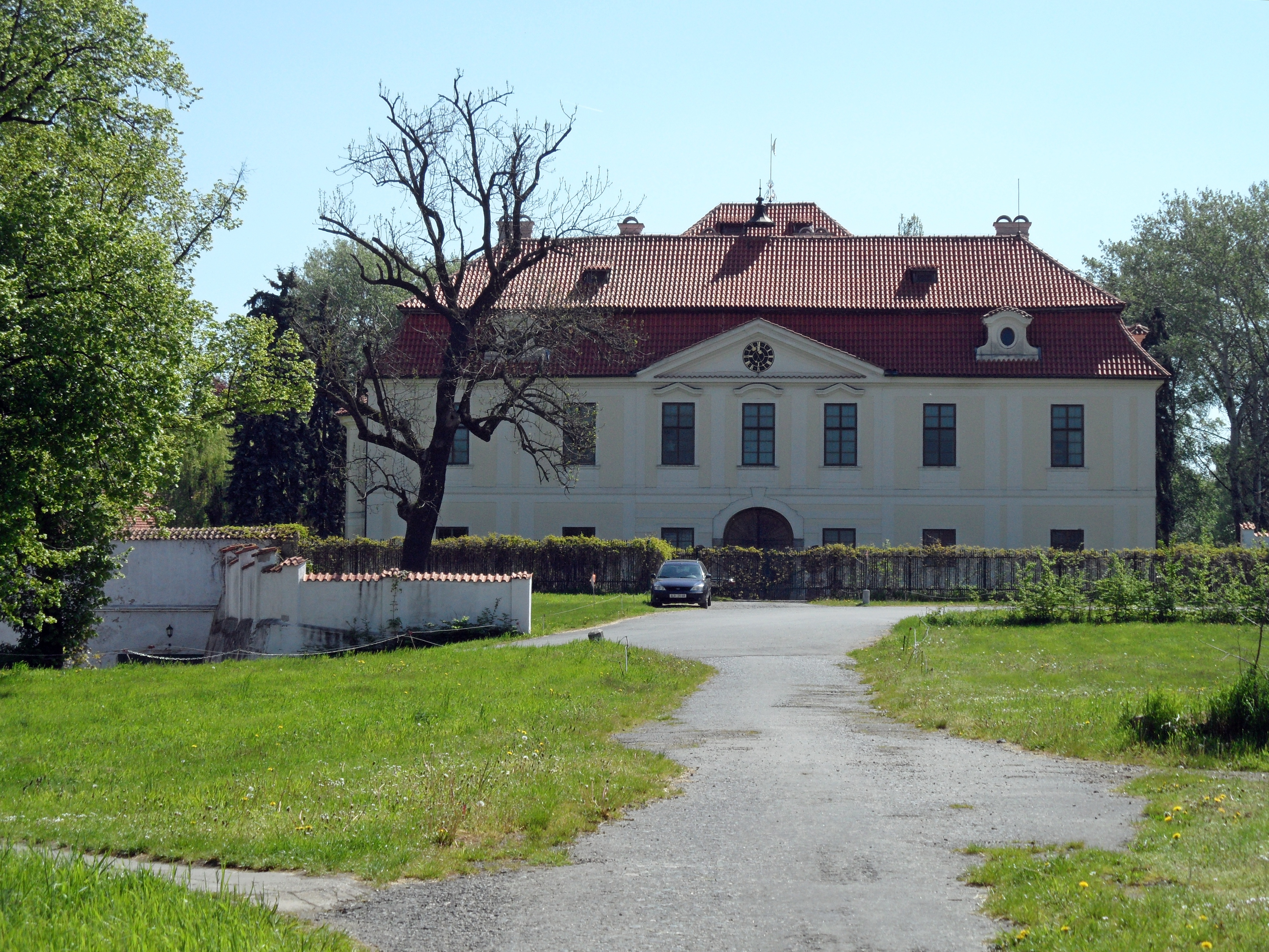
- Bečváry Castle

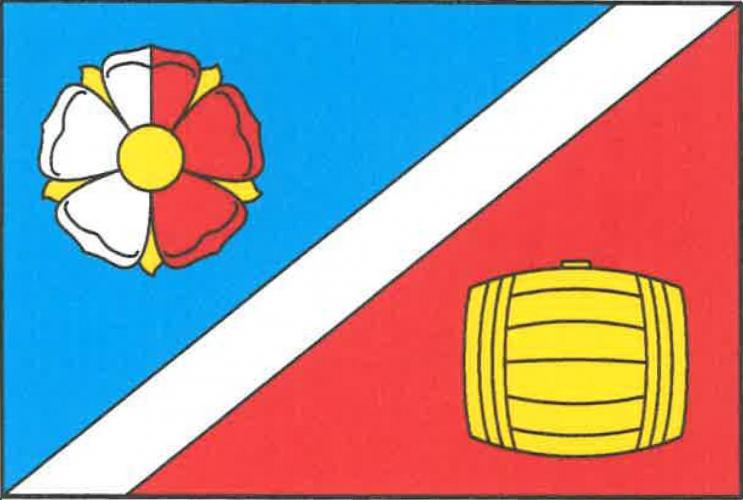
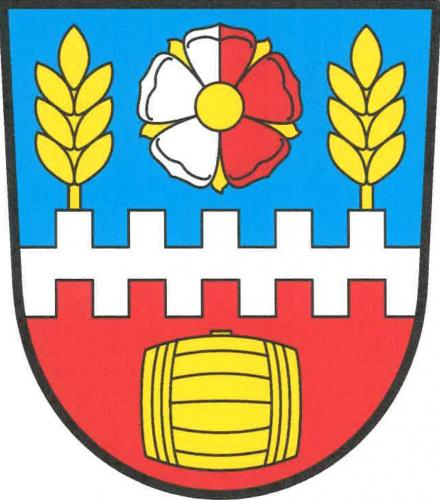
- Flag Coat of arms

- Location in the Czech Republic
- Coordinates: 49°57′24″N 15°4′48″E
- Country: Czech Republic
- Region: Central Bohemian
- District: Kolín
- First mentioned: 1265

Area
  - Total: 16.28 km^{2} (6.29 sq mi)
- Elevation: 320 m (1,050 ft)

Population (2026-01-01)
  - Total: 1,068
  - Density: 65.60/km^{2} (169.9/sq mi)
- Time zone: UTC+1 (CET)
  - Summer (DST): UTC+2 (CEST)
- Postal codes: 281 43, 281 44, 285 04
- Website: www.becvary.cz

Bečváry (German: Betschwar) is a municipality and village in Kolín District in the Central Bohemian Region of the Czech Republic. It has about 1,100 inhabitants.

== Administrative division ==
Bečváry consists of five municipal parts (in brackets population according to the 2021 census):

- Bečváry (513)
- Červený Hrádek (300)
- Hatě (49)
- Horní Jelčany (50)
- Poďousy (132)

Hatě and Horní Jelčany form an exclave of the municipal territory.

== Etymology ==
The name is derived from the word bečvář, i.e. 'cooper'. It was a village where coopers lived.

== Geography ==
Bečváry is located about 11 kilometres (7 mi) southwest of Kolín and 40 km (25 mi) east of Prague. It lies in the Upper Sázava Hills. The highest point is at 430 m (1,411 ft) above sea level. The Bečvárka Stream flows through the municipality and supplies the fishpond Podbečvárský rybník.

== History ==
The first written mention of Bečváry is from 1265.

== Demographics ==
Historical population

Year	Pop.	±%
1869	1,658	—
1880	1,970	+18.8%
1890	1,915	−2.8%
1900	1,840	−3.9%
1910	1,776	−3.5%

Year	Pop.	±%
1921	1,721	−3.1%
1930	1,624	−5.6%
1950	1,276	−21.4%
1961	1,386	+8.6%
1970	1,230	−11.3%

Year	Pop.	±%
1980	1,148	−6.7%
1991	1,022	−11.0%
2001	994	−2.7%
2011	981	−1.3%
2021	1,044	+6.4%

Source: Censuses

== Transport ==
The I/2 road from Prague to Kutná Hora and Pardubice runs through the municipality.

== Transport ==
Bečváry is located on the railway line Kolín–Ledečko.

== Sights ==
The main landmark of Bečváry is the late Baroque castle. Construction of the castle started in the mid-18th century, but the building remained unfinished until the rule of Ernst Gideon von Laudon, who had the castle rebuilt and expanded between 1766 and 1774. Nowadays, the castle is not accessible to the public and is being gradually reconstructed by a private owner.
