= Battle of Domstadtl =

1758 battle between the Habsburg monarchy and the Kingdom of Prussia

Coordinates: 49.7383°N 17.4433°E

Battle of Domstadtl (Domašov)
- Part of The Third Silesian War (Seven Years' War)
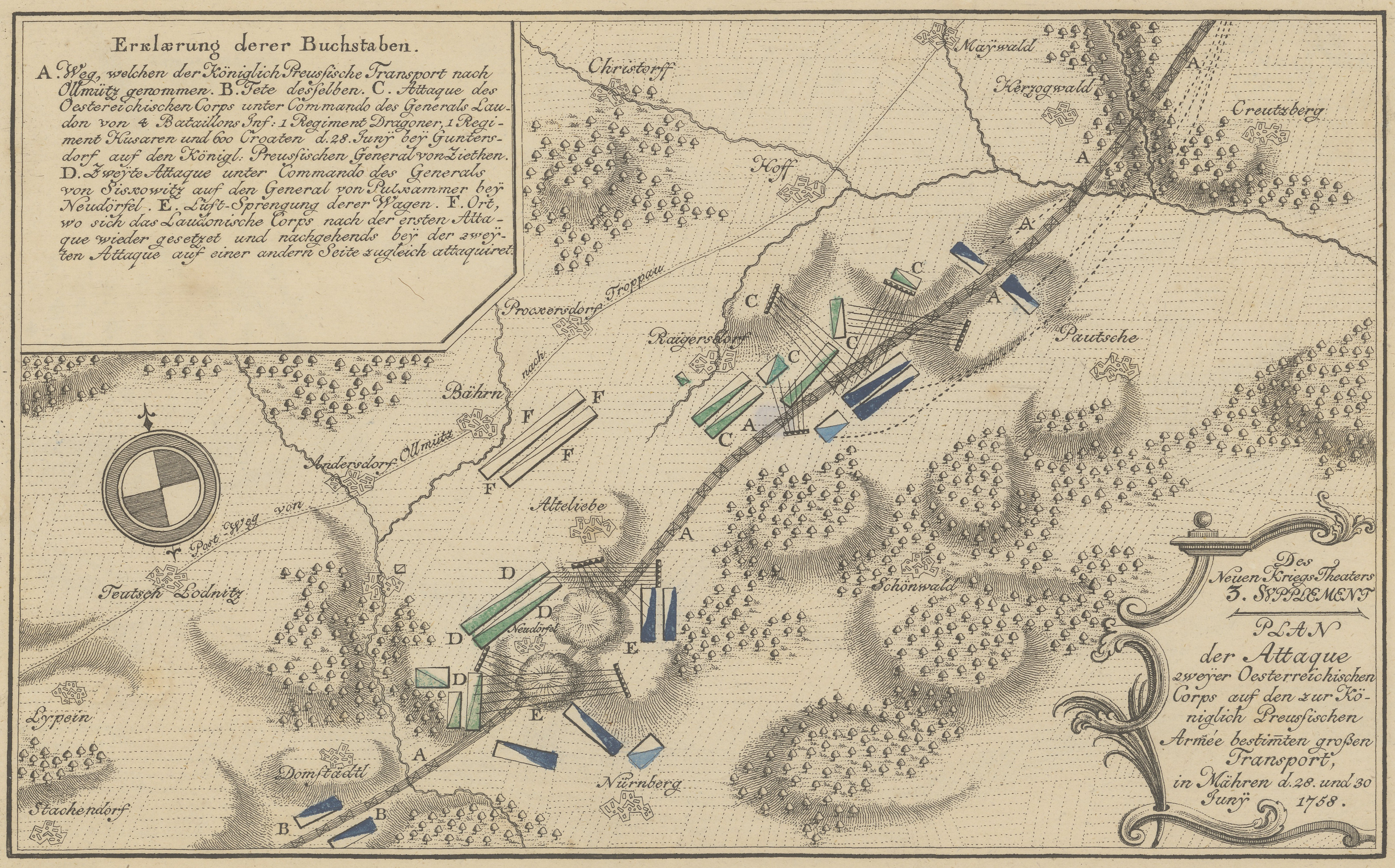
- German map of the battle (1763)
Date	30 June 1758
Location	Domašov nad Bystřicí, Moravia, Habsburg monarchy (now the Czech Republic)
Result	Austrian victory

Belligerents
(Kingdom of Prussia) Prussia	(Habsburg monarchy) Austria

Commanders and leaders
Hans Joachim von Zieten; Friedrich Wilhelm von der Mosel	Ernst Gideon von Laudon; Josip Šišković

Strength
7,000	12,000

Casualties and losses
2,700–3,500 dead, wounded, missing, or captured	680 dead or wounded

The Battle of Domstadtl (also spelled Domstadt, Czech: Domašov) was a battle between the Habsburg monarchy and the Kingdom of Prussia in the Moravian village of Domašov nad Bystřicí during the Third Silesian War (part of the Seven Years' War) on 30 June 1758, preceded by a minor clash at Guntramovice (Gundersdorf) on 28 June. Austrians under the command of Major General Ernst Gideon von Laudon and Major General Joseph von Siskovits attacked and destroyed a supply convoy bound for the Prussian army besieging Olomouc (Olmütz). The Austrian victory saved the city and the Prussian King Frederick the Great was forced to leave Moravia.

== Prussian invasion of Moravia ==
Frederick the Great invaded Moravia in the beginning of May 1758 and besieged the fortified city of Olomouc. He hoped that the Austrian army would come to help the fortress and the Prussians would defeat them in a big battle at the place of their choice. If the Austrian army did not come, he could conquer the fortress in a short time and use it as a base for defending Silesia and increasing pressure on Vienna.

Austrian Field Marshal Leopold Joseph von Daun knew the strength of the Prussian army and therefore avoided a decisive clash. Instead, the Austrians concentrated on attacking the Prussian supply lines and causing them damage in minor skirmishes. The defenders of the Olomouc fortress also struggled bravely and held on much longer than Frederick had expected. Although by June it was on the edge of being taken, with the defensive walls destroyed by cannons in two places, the Prussians desperately needed new supplies to be able to continue the fight.

== Convoy ==
Frederick was afraid that many separate, small convoys protected by small forces could be easily captured by the Austrians and he therefore decided that one huge convoy guarded by a large, strong force should be sent. The supplies for the convoy were collected in Silesia and at the end of June it arrived in the territory of Moravia.

The convoy was so big that there was no chance it could be kept secret. It contained about 4,000 wagons loaded with military materiel and was accompanied by about 2,500 head of cattle. As it set out on its way, it stretched for 45 km.

The convoy was protected by 10,870 soldiers commanded by Colonel Wilhelm von Mosel. The strongest part was probably cavalry consisting of 1,341 men; further, he had eight infantry battalions created from new recruits or healed veterans.

As soon as Field Marshal Daun learned about the convoy, he decided it had to be stopped and destroyed. The task was given to Ernst Gideon von Laudon and Joseph von Siskovits.

== Battles ==
=== Guntramovice ===
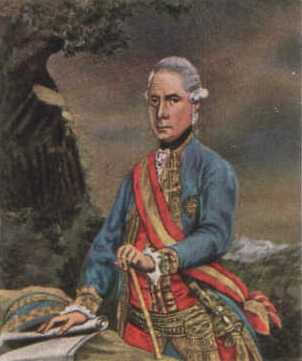
Ernst Gideon von Laudon. The battles of Guntramovice and Domašov were his first big successes. Later, he was promoted to field marshal.

Laudon awaited the enemy at Guntramovice, a small village in northern Moravia. Siskovits, who had lost his way in the woods, was supposed to arrive in two days. This was quite a problem for Laudon, because his four infantry battalions, a regiment of dragoons, a regiment of hussars, an artillery battery, and a troop of frontier guards, had only about 6,000 men. Despite this, he decided to attack the Prussians because Olomouc was near and there was no time for waiting. He also knew that five battalions of 20,000 Prussian soldiers commanded by Lieutenant-General Hans Joachim von Zieten were rushing towards the convoy to help Mosel.

The convoy arrived on 28 June early in the morning. The Austrians started shooting at the lead wagons. One Prussian battalion forged ahead in order to find out the strength of the enemy, but they were routed by the Austrian artillery. The Prussians also formed artillery batteries on their side of the road and started shooting. They tried to attack the Austrian positions in the hilly terrain several times, but were always forced back. The fight took about five hours but finally the Prussians started to dominate the battleground and Laudon ordered his men to retreat towards Moravský Beroun, which they did without any problems, because Mosel did not have enough cavalry to chase them.

Although Laudon retreated and did not manage to destroy the convoy, his losses were much smaller than the Prussian ones. However, the most precious thing that he gained was time. Nowadays, some historians point out that the Prussians had a chance to succeed if they had sacrificed some of the dispersed wagons and immediately rushed to Olomouc. However, neither Mosel nor Zieten, who reached the convoy several hours after the clash, knew about Siskovits' approaching forces, and therefore they decided to devote some time to rearranging the convoy and repairing damage. They continued on 30 June early in the morning.

=== Domašov ===
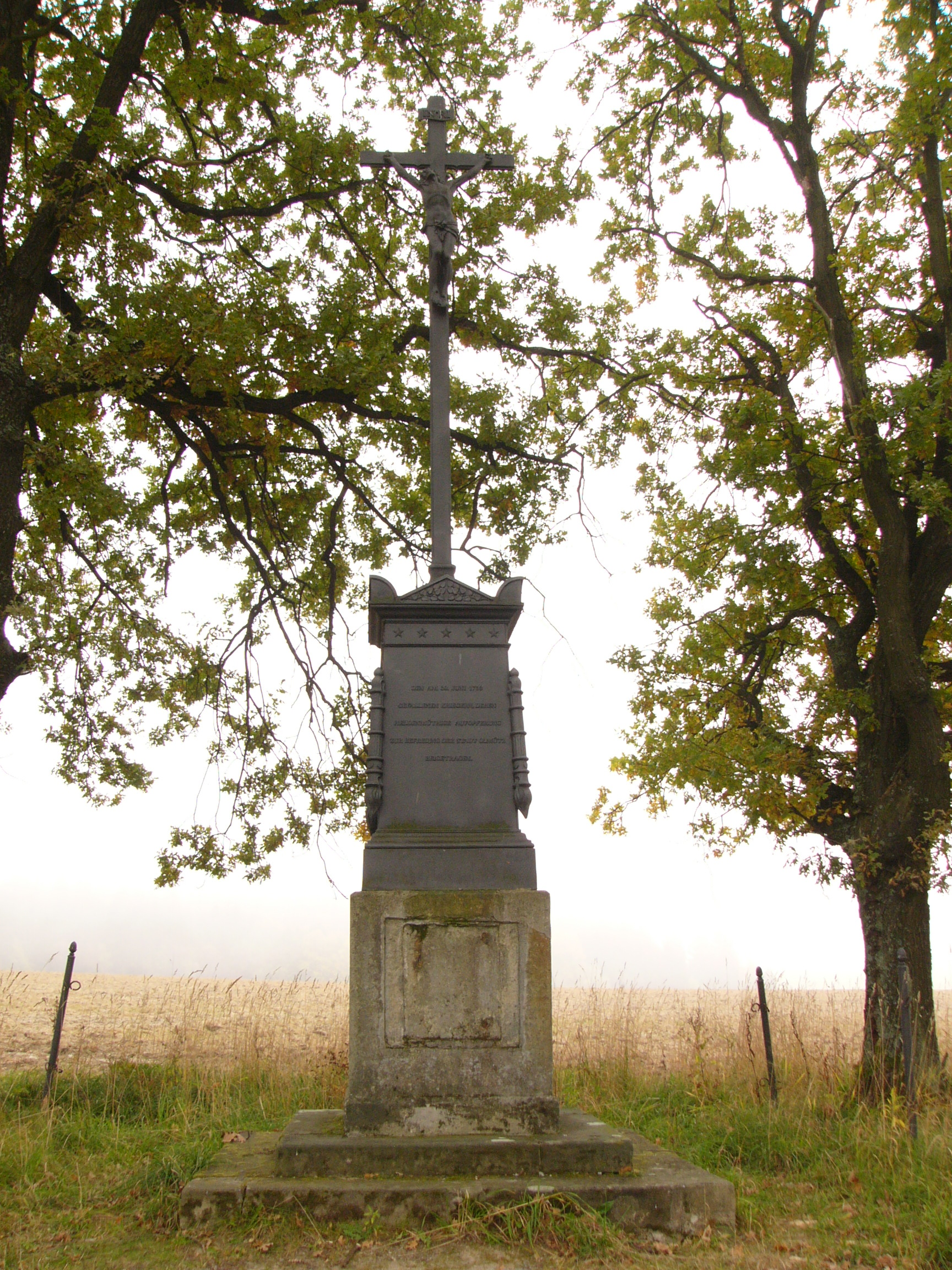
"Black Cross", memorial of the battle near Domašov

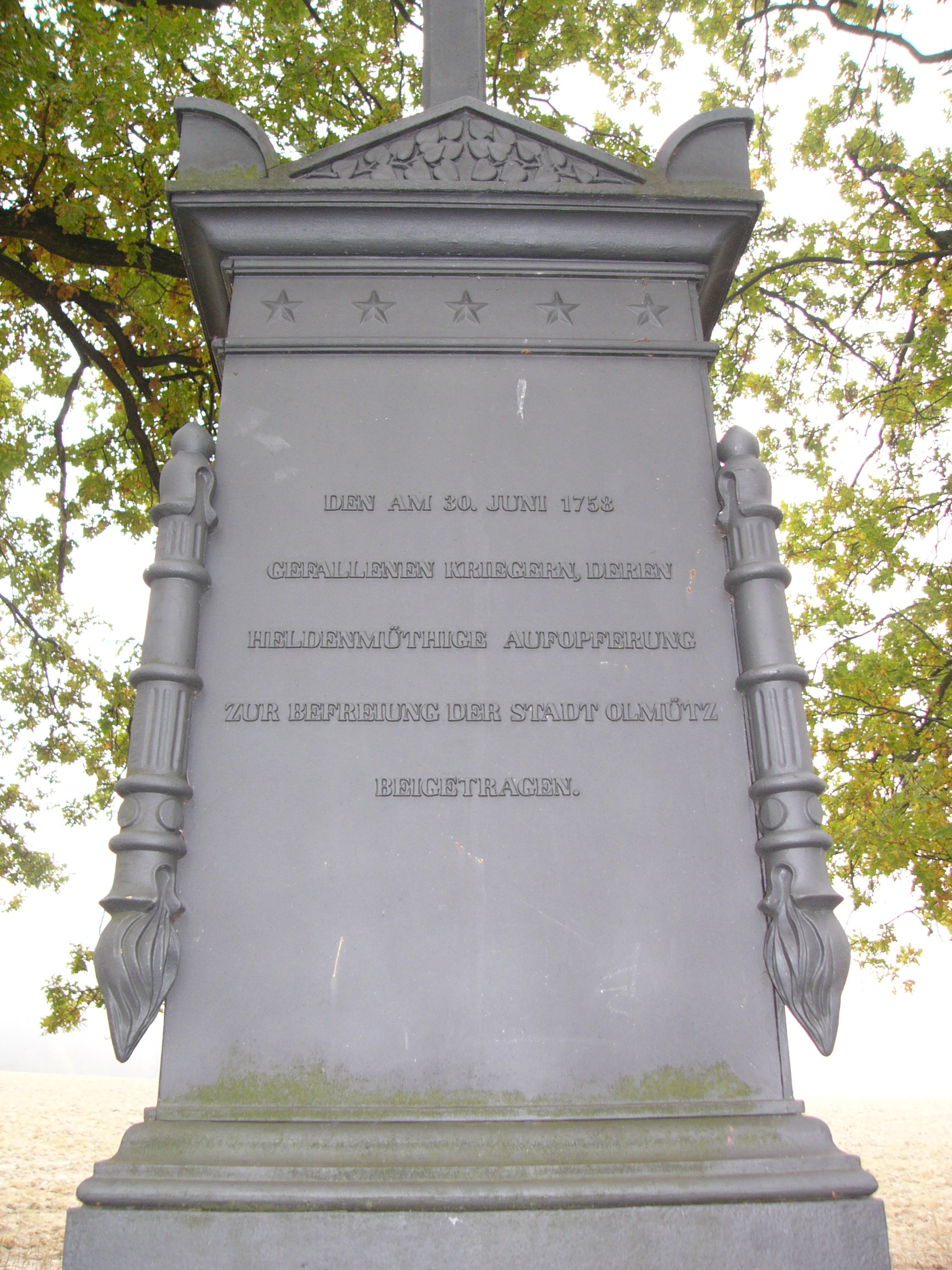
Writing on the memorial in German: On 30 July 1758 to fallen warriors, whose brave feat helped to free Olomouc city.

Meanwhile, the Austrians prepared for a new attack. They chose an open place between Domašov nad Bystřicí and Nová Véska, which was surrounded by hills and woods, ideal for an ambush.

Siskovits' troops arrived on the scene first and waited for the enemy in the woods on the left side of the road. Laudon was supposed to come from Moravský Beroun later, in the middle of the fight, and attack from the opposite side, thus increasing the chaos among the Prussian soldiers.

First, the vanguard consisting of 4,850 soldiers and 250 wagons arrived, but Siskovits let them go. Austrian artillery started the fight when the main body of the convoy was passing, which caused enormous chaos among the wagons. Siskovits' infantry was fighting successfully with Prussian soldiers despite being outnumbered 3 to 1, and when Laudon's troops appeared from the other side, the result of the battle was determined. After 7 hours of fighting, the Prussian convoy was routed.

=== Casualties ===
Although the total number of fighting Austrian soldiers was approximately 12,000, they lost (at Guntramovice and Domašov together) only about 680 of them. The Prussian casualties were much higher, although different sources give different numbers. The Austrians claimed about 2,000 killed, injured, or missing soldiers, and 1,450 captured (including General Puttkamer and 40 other officers), while Prussians reported only 2,701 killed, injured, missing, and captured soldiers altogether, although they admitted that they found it difficult to count them precisely due to the complete dispersion of their troops after the battle.

The victors also seized 2,200 horses, numerous cattle, and a major part of the transported materiel. Because many of the wagons were damaged during the battle, they burned everything they were not able to take away with them. Some of the ammunition wagons were blown up as part of the victory celebrations. An important part of the spoils was 2 million Prussian thalers (according to some sources it was 1 million), but the Austrian commanders let their soldiers keep half of it and only the residual part reached the state coffers.

Only 250 wagons from the vanguard escaped, but some of them were captured by Croatian soldiers near Svatý Kopeček, only several kilometers north of Olomouc, and as a result only about 100–200 of them reached their destination.

== Consequences ==
The importance of the battle is sometimes underestimated. The number of casualties on either side was not as high as in other notable battles of that time, but the loss of the supplies for the Prussian army had severe consequences. It significantly influenced Frederick's opinion on whether to continue to besiege Olomouc and shocked the Prussian camp. When Daun finally came to help Olomouc, the Prussians were forced to abandon the siege of the city as the lack of ammunition had made its capture impossible. The Prussian army retreated to Silesia. The Battles of Guntramovice and Domašov were the turning point in the fight for Moravia.

A memorial named "Black Cross" was built to the northeast of Domašov in 1858 on the occasion of the 100th anniversary of the battle. There is also a memorial to soldiers killed in the battle to the southeast of Guntramovice.
