= Franz Moritz von Lacy =

Austrian military leader (1725–1801)

Graf Franz Moritz von Lacy
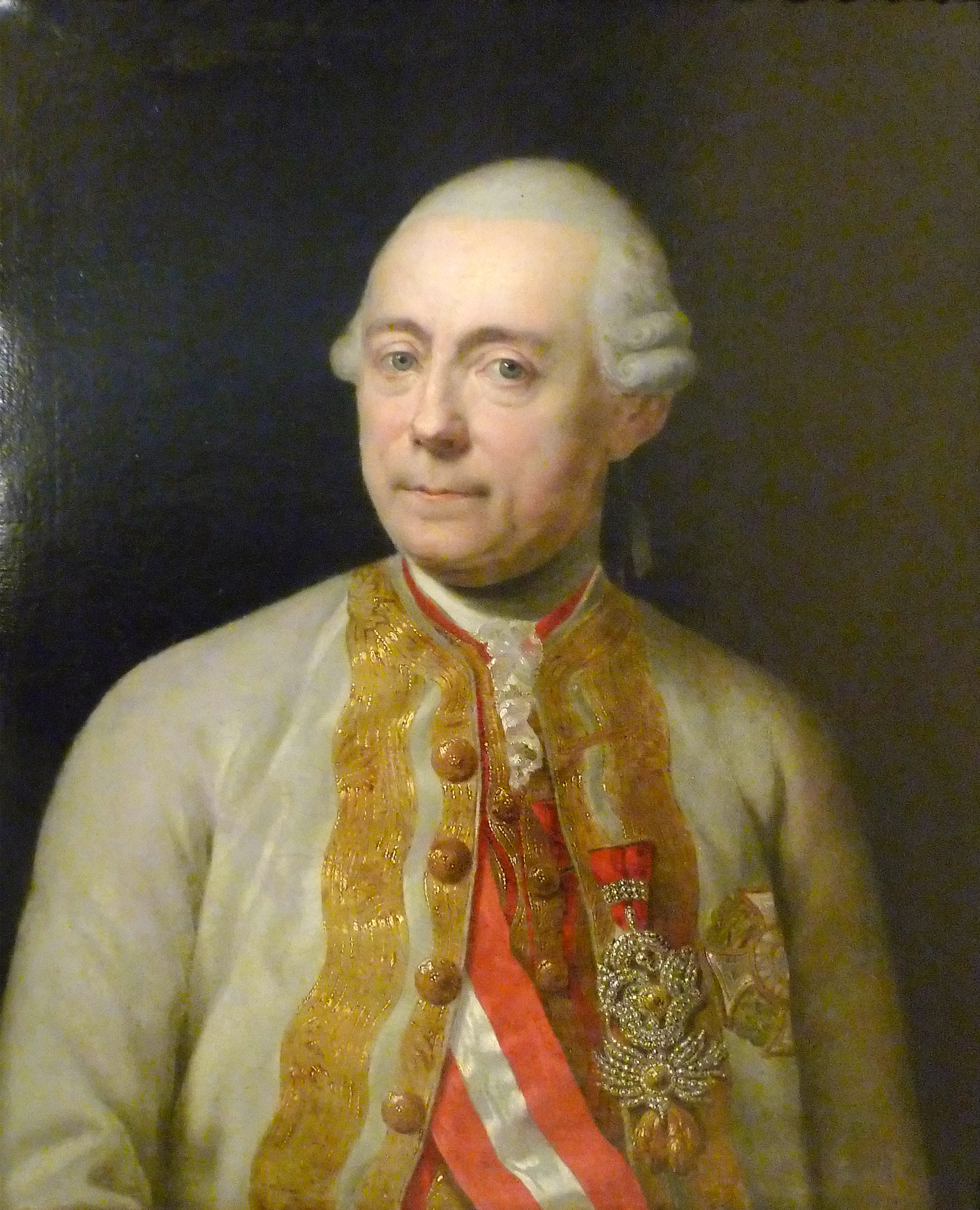
- Born: 21 October 1725; Saint Petersburg, Russian Empire
- Died: 24 November 1801 (aged 76); Vienna, Archduchy of Austria, Holy Roman Empire
- Burial place: Neuwaldegg, Vienna
- Relatives: Peter Graf von Lacy (father); Maurice de Lacy (cousin); George Browne (cousin); Johann Georg von Browne (cousin once removed); Francis Anthony de Lacy (uncle); Luis de Lacy (cousin once removed)
- Military career
- Allegiance: Holy Roman Empire
- Branch: Imperial Army
- Service years: 1743–1790s
- Rank: Generalfeldmarschall
- Conflicts: War of the Austrian Succession; Battle of Velletri; Seven Years' War; Battle of Lobositz; Battle of Prague; Battle of Breslau; Battle of Leuthen; Battle of Hochkirch; Battle of Kunersdorf; Siege of Dresden; Battle of Torgau; War of the Bavarian Succession; Austro-Turkish War (1788–1791)

Franz Moritz Graf von Lacy (Note: English: Francis Maurice de Lacy; Irish: Proinsias Muiris de Lása; Russian: Борис Петрович Ласси, romanized: Boris Petrovich Lassi.) (21 October 1725 – 24 November 1801) was an Austrian military leader of Baltic German and Irish origins. He was the son of Count Peter von Lacy, and was a famous Austrian field marshal. Lacy served during the reign of Maria Theresa, and was a close friend to Joseph II, Holy Roman Emperor, becoming one of the latter's advisers. He was made a count of the Holy Roman Empire, while his father had been a count of the Russian Empire.

== Early life ==
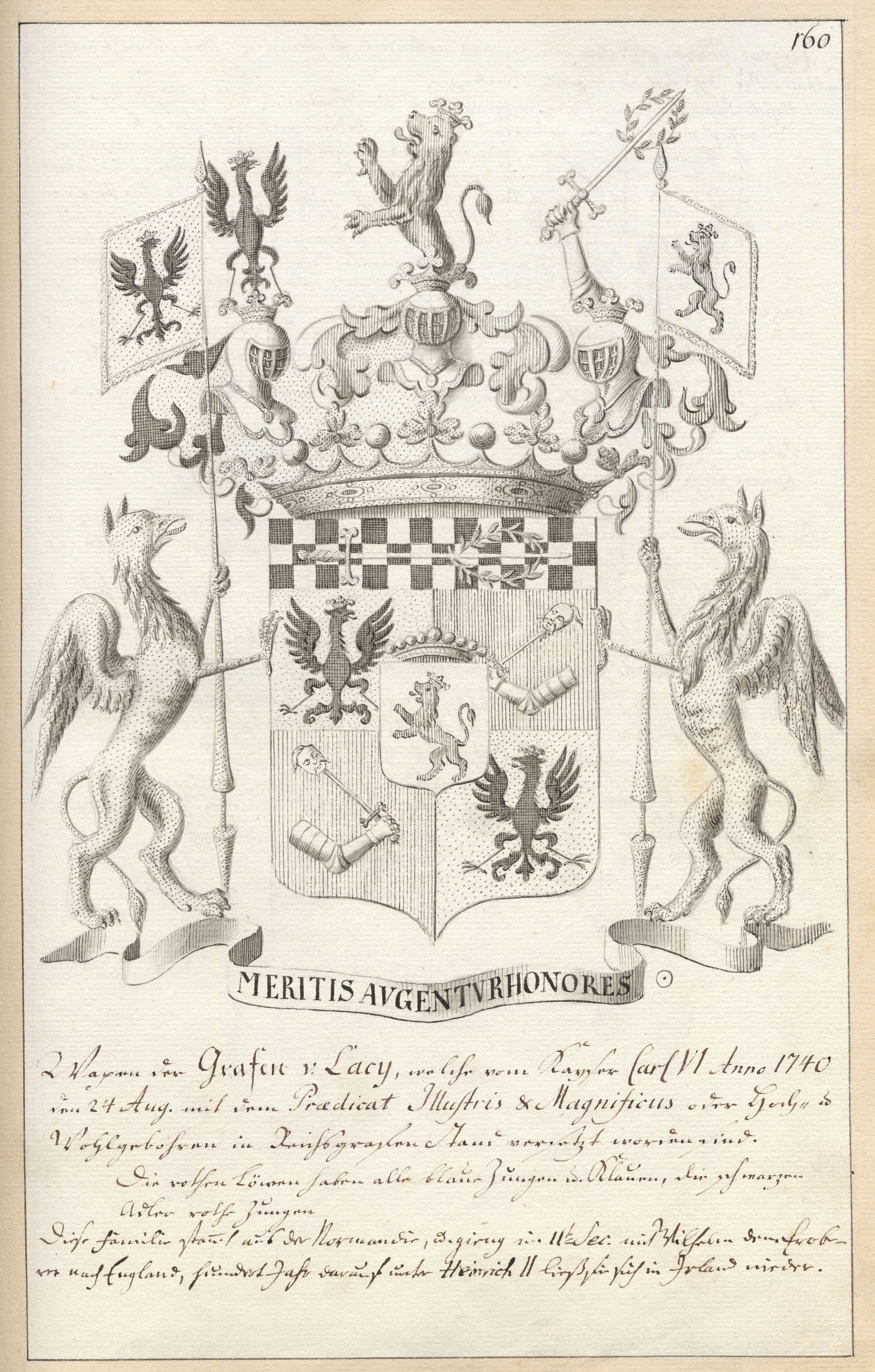
Arms of Franz Moritz von Lacy

He was born as the son of Count Peter von Lacy and his second wife, Margareta Filippina von Funcken-Lösern (1685–1759), widowed Countess Frölich. His father was a Russian Field Marshal who belonged to the Irish branch of the de Lacy family and had followed James II into exile. Franz Moritz was born in St Petersburg, and was educated in Germany for a military career, and entered the Austrian service. He served in Italy, Bohemia, Silesia and the Netherlands during the War of the Austrian Succession, was twice wounded, and by the end of the war was a lieutenant-colonel. At the age of twenty-five he became full colonel and chief of an infantry regiment.

== Seven Years' War ==
In 1756 with the opening of the Seven Years' War he was again on active service, and in the first battle (Lobositz) he distinguished himself so much that he was at once promoted major-general. He received his third wound on this occasion and his fourth at the battle of Prague in 1757. Later in 1757 Lacy bore a conspicuous part in the great victory of Breslau, and at Leuthen, where he received his fifth wound, he covered the retreat of the defeated army. Soon after this began his association with Field-Marshal Daun, the new generalissimo of the empress's forces, and these two commanders, powerfully assisted later by the genius of Laudon, made headway against Frederick the Great for the remainder of the war.

Lacy, a lieutenant field-marshal at thirty-two, was made chief of staff (quartermaster-general) to Daun in the newly created general staff. They were cautious to the point of timidity since Leuthen and many other bitter defeats had taught the Austrians to respect Frederick; but, having resolved to wear out the enemy by Fabian methods, they were strong enough to persist to the end. Thus for some years the life of Lacy, as of Daun and Laudon, is the story of the war against Prussia. After Hochkirch (October 15, 1758) Lacy received the Grand Cross of the Order of Maria Theresa. In 1759 both Daun and Lacy fell into disfavour for failing to win victories, and Lacy owed his promotion to Feldzeugmeister only to the fact that Laudon had just received this rank for the brilliant conduct of his detachment at Kunersdorf. He shadowed Frederick the Great's Prussian army during the failed Siege of Dresden in 1760. His responsibilities told heavily on Lacy in the ensuing campaigns, and his capacity for supreme command was doubted even by Daun, who refused to give him the command when he himself was wounded at the Battle of Torgau.

== Later career ==
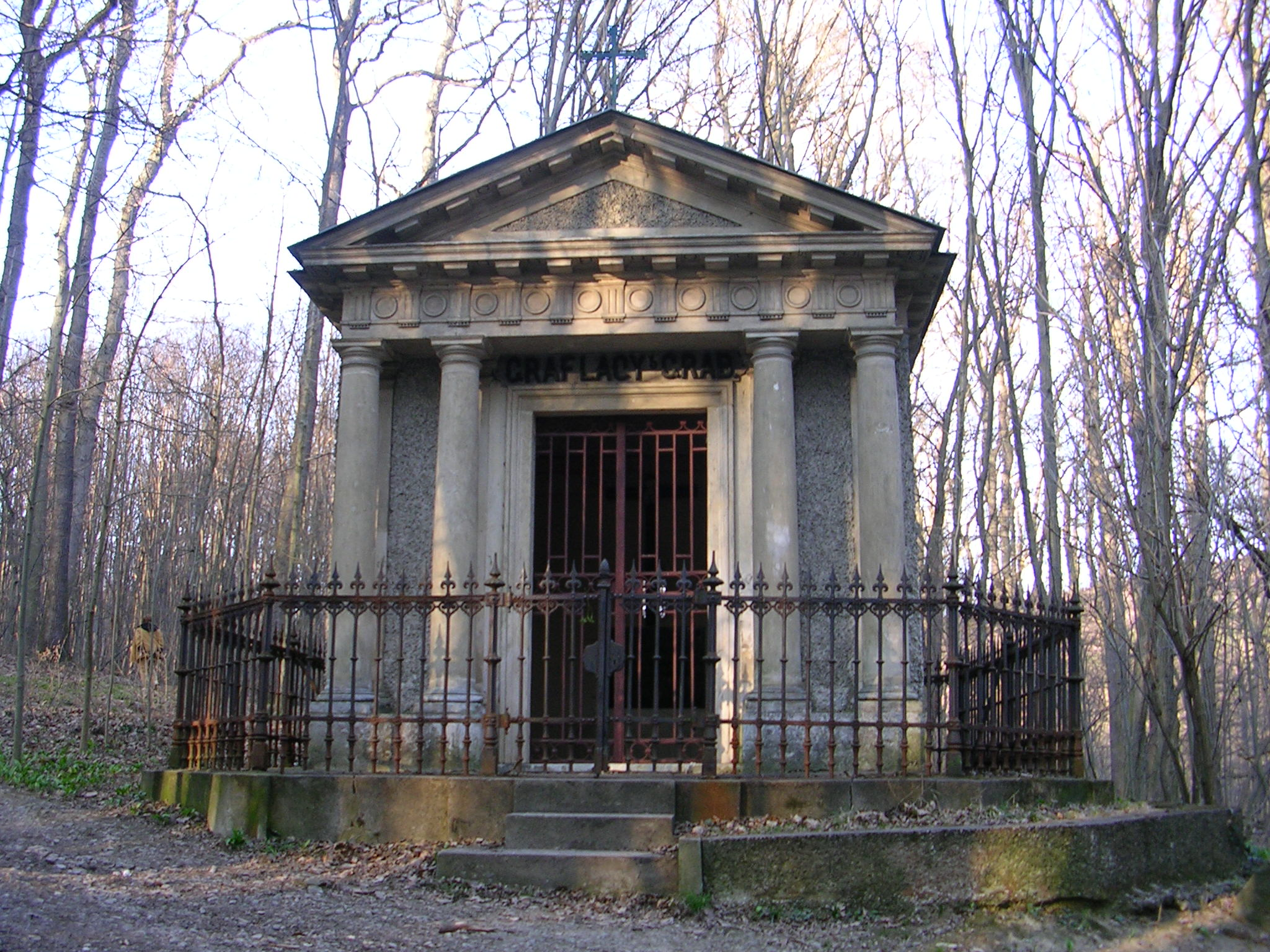
Tomb of Franz Moritz von Lacy in the Schwarzenbergpark in Neuwaldegg, Vienna

After the Treaty of Hubertusburg a new sphere of activity was opened, in which Lacy's special gifts had the greatest scope. Maria Theresa having placed her son, Emperor Joseph II, at the head of Austrian military affairs, Lacy was made a field marshal, and given the task of reforming and administering the army (1766). He framed new regulations for each arm, a new code of military law, a good supply system. As the result of his work the Austrian army was more numerous, far better equipped, and cheaper than it had ever been before. Joseph soon became very intimate with his military adviser, but this did not prevent his mother, after she became estranged from the young emperor, from giving Lacy her full confidence. His activities were not confined to the army. He was in sympathy with Joseph's innovations, and was regarded by Maria Theresa as a prime mover in the scheme for the partition of Poland. But his self-imposed work broke down Lacy's health, and in 1773, in spite of the remonstrances of Maria Theresa and of the emperor, he laid down all his offices and went to southern France. On returning he was still unable to resume office, though as an unofficial adviser in political and military matters he was far from idle.

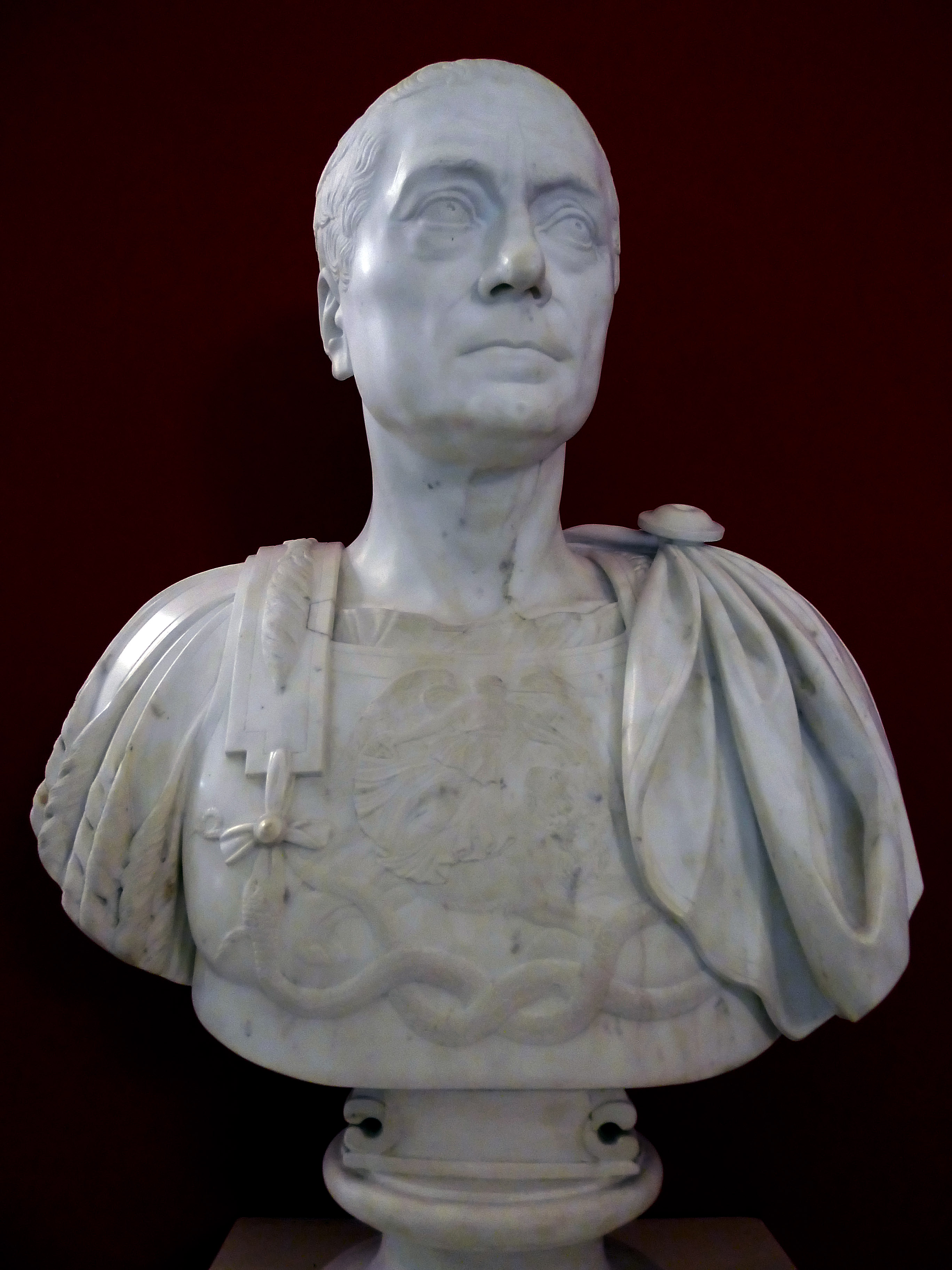
Marble bust of Franz Moritz von Lacy by Giuseppe Ceracci

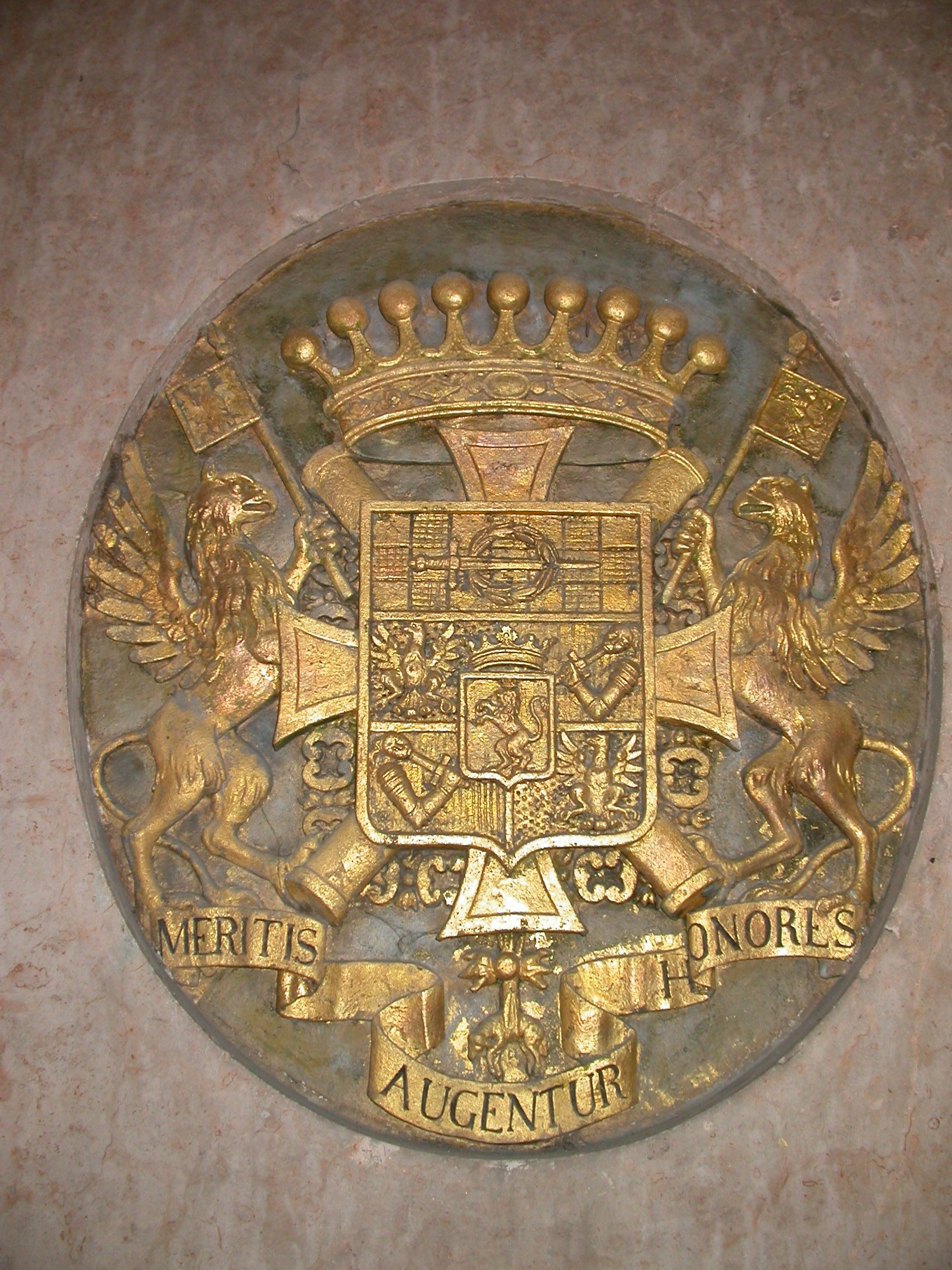
Arms of Franz Moritz von Lacy from his crypt in Vienna

In the brief and uneventful War of the Bavarian Succession, Lacy and Laudon were the chief Austrian commanders against the King of Prussia, and when Joseph II at Maria Theresa's death, became the sovereign of the Austrian dominions as well as emperor, Lacy remained his most trusted friend. More serious than the War of the Bavarian Succession was the Turkish war which presently broke out. Lacy was now old and worn out, and his tenure of command therein was not marked by any greater measure of success than in the case of the other Austrian generals. His active career was at an end, although he continued his effective interest in the affairs of the state and the army throughout the reign of Joseph's successor, Leopold II. His last years were spent in retirement at his Neuwaldegg Castle near Vienna. He is buried in a mausoleum in the castle grounds.

== Ancestry ==
His father was the Irish-born Russian field marshal and general, commander of Saint Petersburg and Veliky Novgorod as well as governor of Riga, Count Pierce Edmond de Lacy (German: Peter Graf von Lacy) (1678–1751).

Ancestors of Franz Moritz von Lacy

8. John (de) Lacy of Ballingarry (Limerick)
4. Peter (Pierce) (de) Lacy; of Killeedy (Limerick)
2. Count Peter von Lacy; [Peter (Pierce) (de) Lacy of Killeedy (Limerick)] (1678–1751)
5. Maria Courteney
1. Count Franz Moritz von Lacy; [Francis Maurice (de) Lacy] (1725–1801)
6. Rembert von Funcken, lord of Liezere
3. Maret Philippine "Martha" von Funcken from Liezere
7. baroness Helena Üksküla (Uexkull-Gyldenband)

== See also ==
- Irish military diaspora
- Irish regiments

== Sources ==
- "Ласси, Франц-Мориц" . Brockhaus and Efron Encyclopedic Dictionary (in Russian). 1906.
