= Battle of Liegnitz (1760) =

Part of the Third Silesian War

- Part of the Third Silesian War (Seven Years' War)
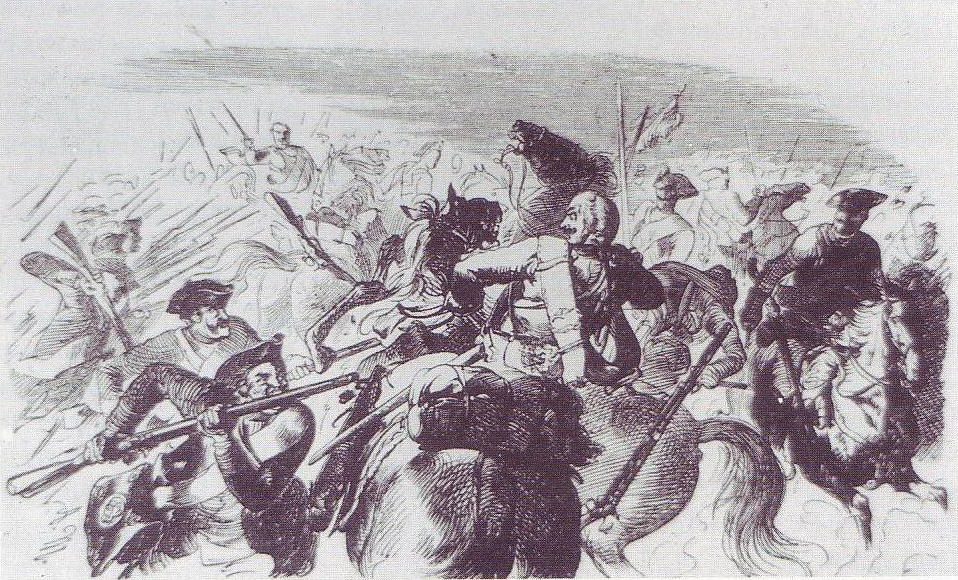
- Prussian infantry attack to the Austrian cavalry during the battle
Date	15 August 1760
Location	Liegnitz, Prussian Silesia, present-day Poland 51°13′30″N 16°11′17″E
Result	Prussian victory

Belligerents
(Kingdom of Prussia) Prussia	Austria

Commanders and leaders
Frederick the Great	Ernst von Laudon

Strength
30,000	25,000 (80,000 reinforcements under von Daun never engaged)

Casualties and losses
3,394	8,537; 3,803 dead and wounded, 4,734 captured, 82 guns

Frederick the Great
current battle
First Silesian War
Second Silesian War
Third Silesian War

The Battle of Liegnitz on 15 August 1760 saw Frederick the Great's Prussian Army defeat the Austrian army under Ernst von Laudon during the Third Silesian War (part of the Seven Years' War).

The armies collided around the town of Liegnitz (now Legnica, Poland) in Lower Silesia. Laudon's Austrian cavalry attacked the Prussian position in the early morning but were beaten back by General Zieten's Hussars. An artillery duel emerged which was eventually won for the Prussians when a shell hit an Austrian powder wagon. The Austrian infantry then proceeded to attack the Prussian line, but was met with concentrated artillery fire. A Prussian infantry counter-attack led by the Regiment Anhalt-Bernburg on the left forced the Austrians into retreat. Notably, the Anhalt-Bernburgers charged Austrian cavalry with bayonets, a rare example of infantry assaulting cavalry.

Shortly after dawn the major action was over but Prussian artillery fire continued to harass the Austrians. General Leopold von Daun arrived and, learning of Laudon's defeat, decided not to attack despite his soldiers being fresh.
