= Siege of Olomouc =

Siege during Third Silesian War

Siege of Olmütz
- Part of the Third Silesian War (Seven Years' War)
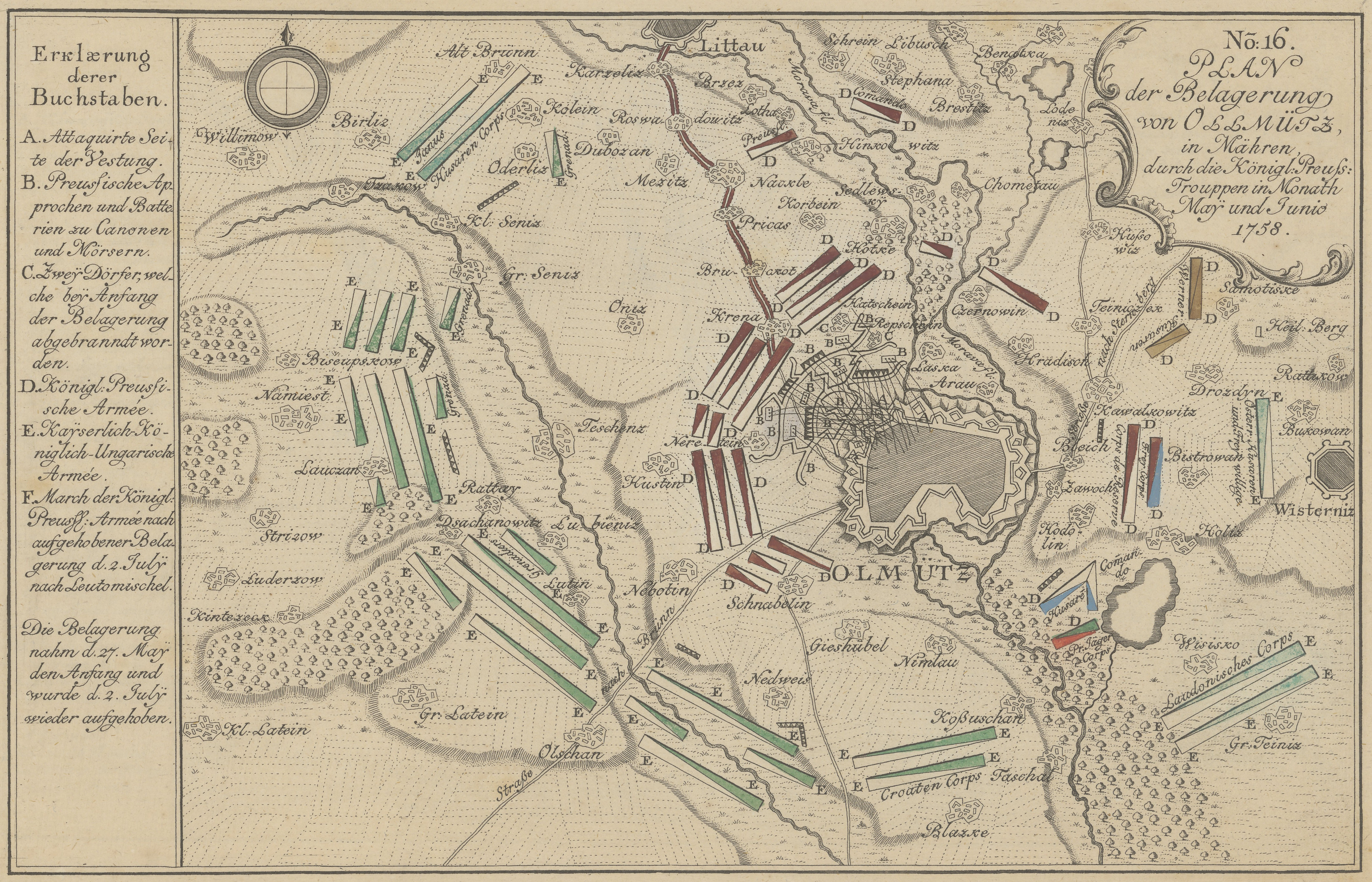
- German map of the siege (1763)
Date	4 May – 2 July 1758
Location	Olomouc, Moravia 49.5954°N 17.2519°E
Result	Austrian victory

Belligerents
(Kingdom of Prussia) Prussia	(Holy Roman Empire) Austria

Commanders and leaders
(Kingdom of Prussia) Frederick the Great	(Holy Roman Empire) Ernst Dietrich von Marschall

Strength
11,000	7,500

Casualties and losses
	189

Frederick the Great
current battle
First Silesian War
Second Silesian War
Third Silesian War

The Siege of Olomouc took place in 1758 when a Prussian army led by Frederick the Great besieged the Austrian city of Olmütz (now Olomouc, Czech Republic) during the Prussian invasion of Moravia in the Third Silesian War (Seven Years' War). The attempt stalled as the besiegers faced stronger resistance than Frederick had expected. With a lack of supplies and the approach of an Austrian relief force following the Battle of Domstadtl, Frederick abandoned the siege and withdrew from Moravia.
