= Battle of Landeshut (1760) =

Part of the Third Silesian and Seven Years' Wars

Coordinates: 50°47′00″N 16°02′00″E

- Part of the Third Silesian War (Seven Years' War)
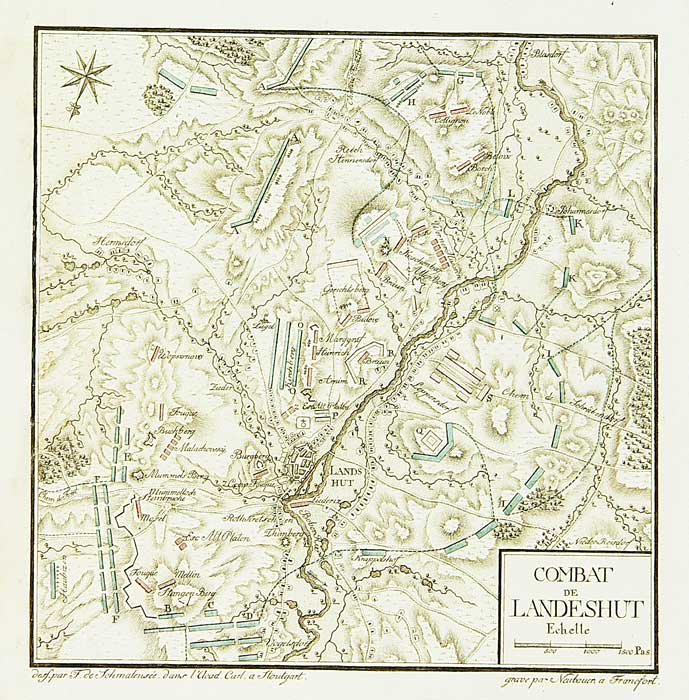
Date	23 June 1760
Location	Landeshut, Silesia (now Kamienna Góra, Poland)
Result	Austrian victory

Belligerents
(Holy Roman Empire) Austria	(Kingdom of Prussia) Prussia

Commanders and leaders
Ernst von Laudon	Heinrich August de la Motte Fouqué (WIA) (POW)

Strength
28,000	12,000; 68 guns

Casualties and losses
2,963; 774 killed, 2,195 wounded	10,242; 1,927 killed, 8,315 captured and wounded, 68 guns

The Battle of Landeshut was an engagement fought on 23 June 1760 during the Third Silesian War (part of the Seven Years' War).

A Prussian army of 12,000 men under General Heinrich August de la Motte Fouqué fought an Austrian army of over 28,000 men under Ernst Gideon von Laudon and suffered a defeat, with its commander wounded and taken prisoner. The Prussians lost 10,242 men including 1,927 killed along with 8,315 prisoners as well as 68 guns captured. The Austrians lost 774 killed and 2,195 wounded. The Prussians fought with resolution, surrendering after running out of ammunition.

== Bibliography ==
- Szabo, Franz A.J. The Seven Years War in Europe, 1757–1763. Pearson, 2008.
