= James Francis Edward Keith =

Scottish-born army officer (1696–1758)

The Honourable James Francis Edward Keith
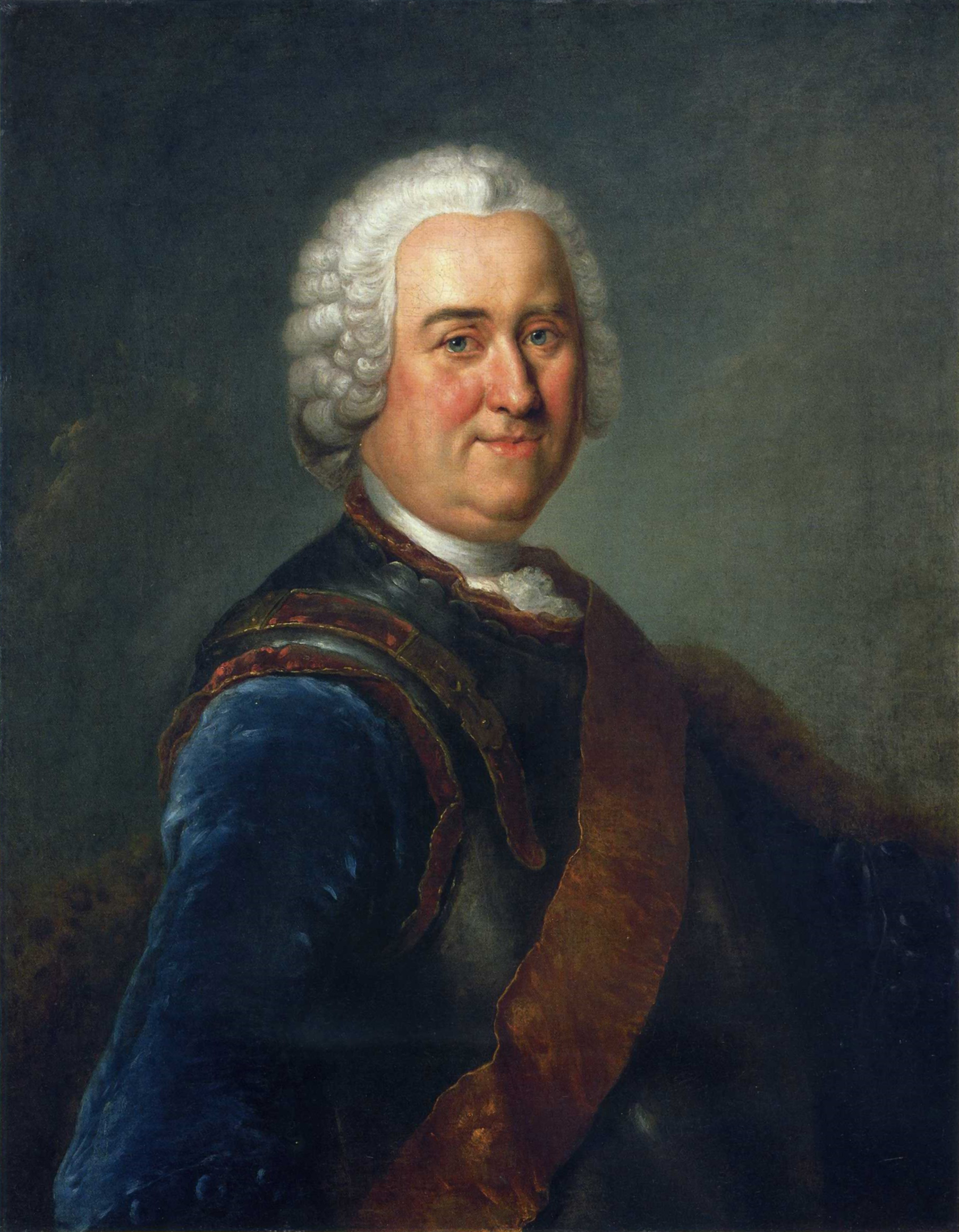
- Portrait by Antoine Pesne, 1755
- Born: 11 June 1696; Inverugie, Kingdom of Scotland
- Died: 14 October 1758 (aged 62); Hochkirch, Electorate of Saxony
- Education: University of Edinburgh; University of Aberdeen
- Relatives: William Keith (father); George Keith (brother)
- Military career
- Allegiance: Jacobites; Spain; Russian Empire; Kingdom of Prussia
- Branch: Prussian Army
- Rank: General field marshal
- Wars: Jacobite rising of 1719; Battle of Glen Shiel; Anglo-Spanish War (1727); Thirteenth siege of Gibraltar; Russo-Swedish War (1741–1743); Capitulation at Helsingfors; Seven Years' War; Battle of Lobositz; Siege of Prague; Battle of Rossbach; Battle of Hochkirch †
- Awards: Order of St. Andrew; Black Eagle Order

James Francis Edward Keith (in later years Jakob von Keith; 11 June 1696 – 14 October 1758) was a Scottish-born army officer and Generalfeldmarschall of the Prussian Army. As a Jacobite he took part in a failed attempt to restore the Stuart Monarchy to Britain. When this failed, he fled to Europe, living in France, and then Spain. He joined the Spanish and eventually the Russian armies and fought in the Anglo-Spanish War and the Russo-Swedish War. In the latter he participated in the conquest of Finland and became its viceroy. Subsequently, he participated in the coup d'état that put Elizabeth of Russia on the throne.

He subsequently served in the Prussian army under Frederick the Great, where he distinguished himself in several campaigns. He died during the Seven Years' War at the Battle of Hochkirch. He received the Black Eagle Order and is memorialised on the Equestrian statue of Frederick the Great.

== Early life ==
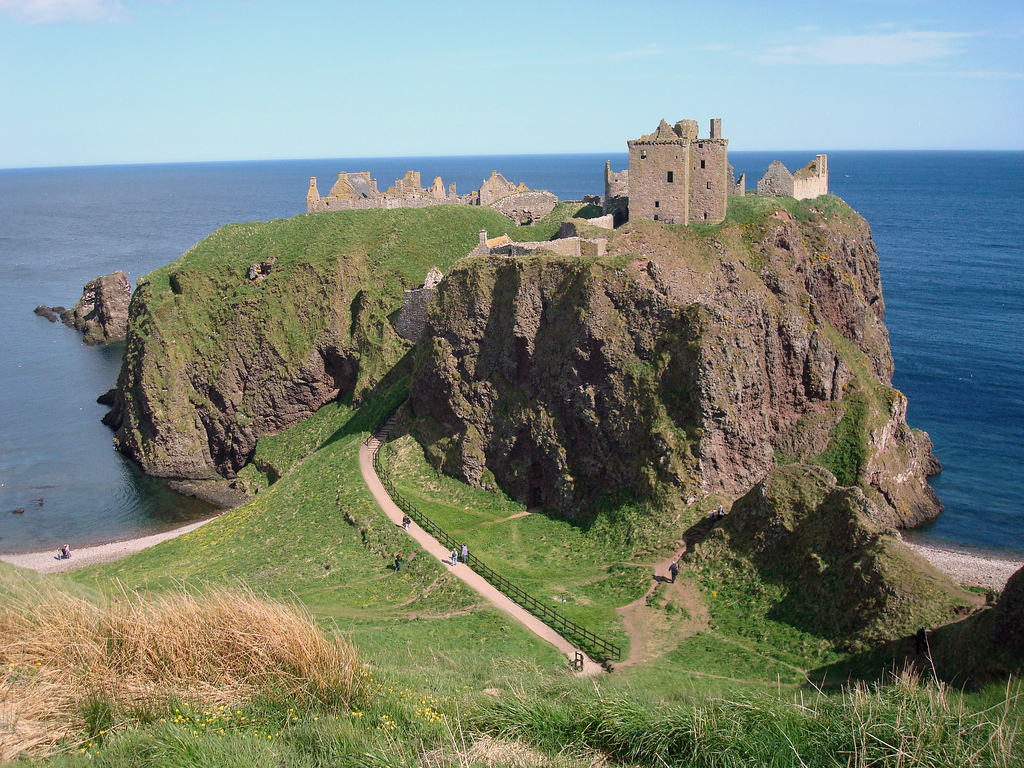
Dunnottar Castle, seat of the chiefs of the Clan Keith

Keith was born on 11 June 1696 at Inverugie Castle near Peterhead, the second son of Mary Drummond and William Keith, 9th Earl Marischal of Scotland. His father was a Knight of the Order of the Thistle, and a member of the Privy Council of James Francis Edward Stuart. His mother, Mary Drummond, was daughter of James Drummond, 4th Earl of Perth (1648–1716), and his first wife, Lady Jane Douglas, the fourth daughter of William Douglas, 1st Marquess of Douglas.

His parents, committed Jacobites, named him after the Old Pretender. He and his brother George (1692/93–1778) were educated by a kinsman, the historian and bishop Robert Keith. After briefly attending the University of Aberdeen, James traveled to study at the University of Edinburgh in preparation for the legal profession. Keith was a keen freemason.

== Jacobitism ==
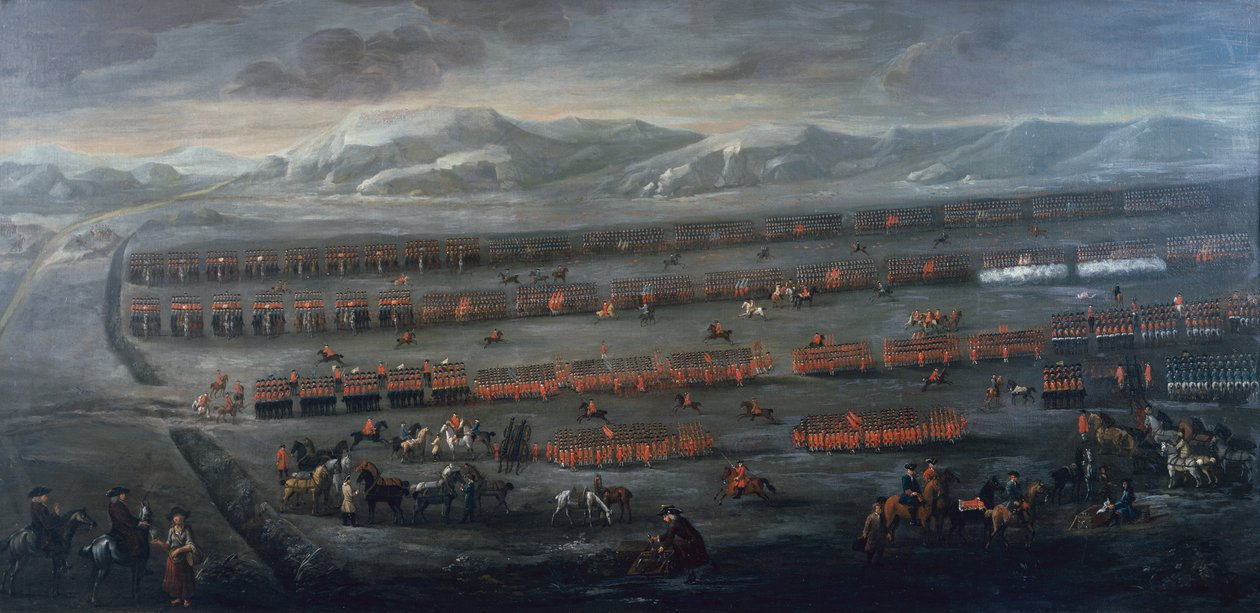
The Battle of Sheriffmuir, which Keith fought in

In his autobiography, Keith makes it clear that his dissatisfaction in Great Britain began with the failure of Queen Anne to settle the Scottish succession on her half-brother James. The placement of a foreign, German family on the throne of the land led to widespread discontent in Scotland. On either 3 or 20 September 1715, he and his brother had stood side by side to proclaim James Stuart, son of the deposed King James VII and pretender to the Scottish throne, as King of Scotland.

Keith was present later that year at the Battle of Sheriffmuir on 9 November. Subsequently, when the Earl of Mar failed to join up with the English Jacobites and the Catholics in the south, Keith realised that the end of this effort was near. The Jacobite effort was briefly resuscitated that year by the arrival of James himself, who landed at Peterhead at the end of December 1715, but when the Jacobites realised that James had travelled on a fishing trawler with two servants, not with an armada bringing the army the Jacobites hoped for, their morale sank even further. Eventually, after Government forces pursued the Jacobites almost to the Isle of Skye, a French Navy warship picked up 100 officers, including Keith, and took them to St. Pol de Leon in Brittany. His activities in this Jacobite rising of 1715 compelled him to remain on the Continent.

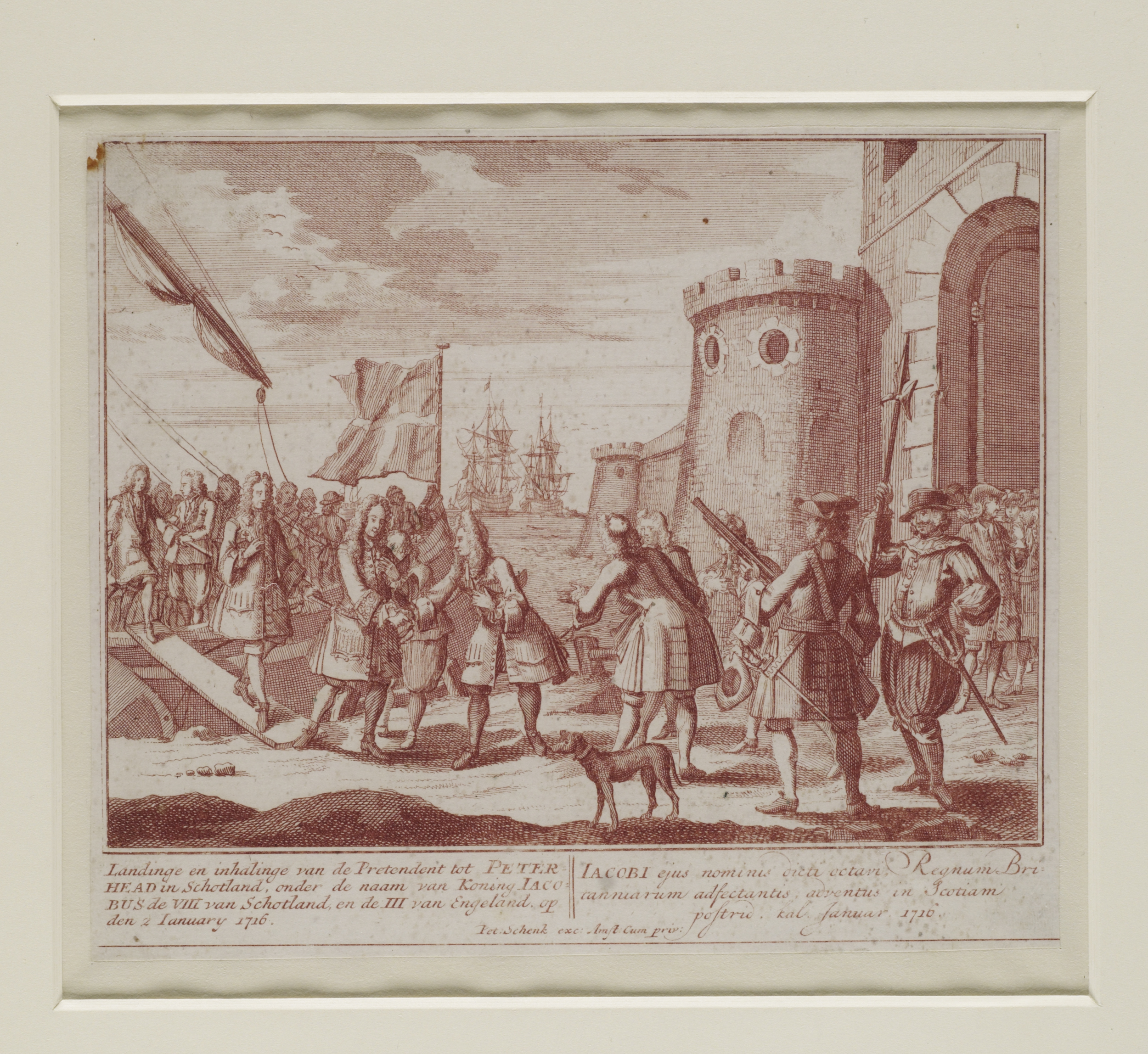
James Francis Edward Stuart arrives in Peterhead

Eventually, Keith went to Paris, where he had relatives. He spent the better part of a year living hand to mouth by selling the personal items he had brought with him, mostly horse furnishings. He could have asked any of his relatives for assistance, but, as he explained in his unfinished memoirs, "... I was then either so bashful or vain, that I wou'd [sic] not own the want I was in." Eventually he received a gift of 1000 livres from Mary of Modena, mother of the Pretender and this, plus some support from home and an allowance from James enabled him to spend the rest of the year at the university. In 1717, he received a commission as colonel of cavalry and was ordered to prepare to go to Scotland again, but the plan, contingent upon support from the Charles XII of Sweden, was discovered and thwarted, and he continued at the university. Later that year, in June, he met Peter I of Russia, and offered the Tsar his sword, being, as Keith considered it "high time ... to quitte [sic] the Academy and endeavor to establish myself somewhere ..." The Tsar apparently saw no need for the sword of a youth.

=== 1719 Uprising ===
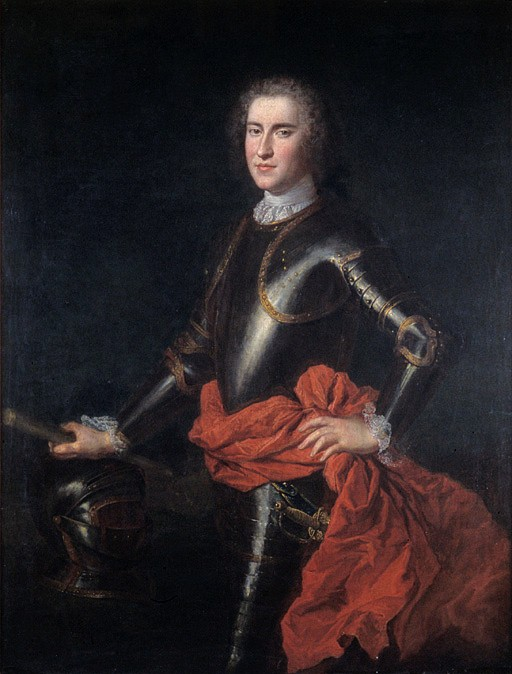
James Keith, aged 24

When Keith was finally convinced to leave Paris (he had fallen in love), he journeyed to Spain with his brother. They had to deceive the customs agents at the borders about their destination, purpose and origins, Spain being actively engaged in trying to secure the French throne for Philip V in the War of the Quadruple Alliance. Keith and his brother journeyed to Madrid, raising funds for an army for James, arranging for its transport to Scotland, and communicating the king's designs to the various Scottish chieftains throughout Europe. At one point in his adventures in Spain, he carried a small note from the James Butler, 2nd Duke of Ormonde and 18,000 crowns to purchase frigates destined to carry an army to Scotland; he returned to France quietly, leaving his brother in Spain to sail with troops to the coast of Scotland. Trying to return to Paris, while in Bordeaux, he masqueraded as a friend's servant so he could acquire some horses to get back to Paris.

In the course of communicating with Jacobite sympathizers in Spain and France, Keith realised that there was a considerable division of factions among James's supporters. The sides all wanted Keith to communicate one thing, or another, often contradictory, to the king, all of which Keith considered favoured their private ends, not the needs of the king or the goals of the campaign. Eventually, the Jacobites embarked for the Isle of Lewis on 19 March in a small ship, from the mouth of the Seine, and set course to round the Orkney Islands The wind forced them off course until, after 24 March, they had altered course and managed to slip past a squadron of Royal Navy men-of-war which were transporting troops from Ireland to England: news of a conspiracy had reached London by then, and the Government had prepared for the uprising.

The Jacobite efforts were further complicated by bickering among the chiefs as to who should take command. Initially, this was awarded to the Marischall, Keith's brother, but the following day, after a long speech by William Murray, Marquess of Tullibardine "which", Keith later wrote, "no body understood but himself," Murray presented his own commission as lieutenant general, outranking the Marischall's, whose commission of command was only as major general. There was, apparently, considerable subsequent disagreement about how the rebellion should proceed, some wishing to wait for the Duke of Ormonde's 500 Spanish marines on the way from Spain. Knowing that the Government forces had discovered their landing place, Keith's brother convinced Murray to disembark all the troops they had and send the Spanish ships home; the Government forces would inevitably blockade the ships in the harbor and losing the ships would endanger their relationship with Spain.

Unfortunately for the rebellion, Ormonde's fleet had been disbanded by a storm near Galicia, and the soonest the Spanish would raise another one would be the following spring. Time to mount any rebellion was running short. The Jacobites were poorly armed and even more poorly provisioned and the Government force was three days march away. The nearby clans made an effort to raise additional troops, but gathered only about 1,000. The Government forces approached with four regiments of foot and a detachment of a fifth regiment, plus 150 dragoons. The Jacobite position was secure enough, but on 10 June, the Government force came out of the mountains and attacked; in short order, the Royal Navy captured Eilean Donan Castle and, at the Battle of Glen Shiel, the Government forces defeated the small Jacobite army. The Jacobites decided that they should disperse and the Spaniards surrender.

Keith spent several months lurking in the mountains and, in early September, embarked for Holland from Peterhead. Upon trying to cross France to reach Spain, the brothers were arrested at Sedan, and ordered to prison. Keith had in his pocket a pair of commissions from the King of Spain, items which would cause them great trouble, but his jailers did not search him, nor ask for his name. For safety, "pretending a certain necessity, [he] threw them in to a place needless to be named."

== Spanish service ==
After leaving France, Keith eventually obtained a colonelcy in the Spanish army as part of the Irish Brigade, then commanded by the Duke of Ormonde. He then fought in the failed Siege of Gibraltar.

Finding his Protestantism a barrier to promotion in Catholic Spain, he obtained a recommendation from the King of Spain to Peter II of Russia.

== Imperial Russian service ==
In Imperial Russian service, Keith was initially assigned to command two regiments of foot belonging to Vasily Vladimirovich Dolgorukov's brigade, he asked for a delay of three months in which he could learn the language and practices of the Russian service. He took the time not only to learn the language, but also to learn the Court and its intricate politics. His first mentor there, James Fitz-James Stuart, 2nd Duke of Berwick and Duke of Liria, fell into a quarrel with both Dolgorukov and Count Matueof.

His commander there, Peter Lacy, had fled Ireland after the Williamite War. He was also one of the first Freemasons active in Russia, as a master of a lodge in Saint Petersburg in 1732–1734. From 1740 to 1741, Keith headed the Governing Council of the Hetman Office, de facto serving as the acting hetman of left-bank Ukraine. He also participated in Elizabeth of Russia's seizure of power in Petersburg. He received the Imperial Order of St Andrew and was granted an estate in Livonia by Empress Elizabeth.

During the Russo-Swedish War of 1741–1743, Keith briefly served as the de facto viceroy of Finland and responsible for the occupying Russian forces, James Keith convened the estates of southwestern Finland on 18 September [O.S. 8 September]. He proved adept as a capable and liberal civil administrator. In late 1742, Keith was succeeded in the leadership of civil administration of Finland (now based at Turku) by the new governor-general, Johannes Balthasar von Campenhausen.

== Prussian service ==
=== Seven Years' War ===
During the Seven Years' War, Keith held high command in the Prussian army. In 1756, he commanded the troops covering the investment of Pirna, and distinguished himself at Lobositz. The battle at Lobositz was a particularly difficult situation. Frederick, in what was his typical manner, dismissed Austrian capability; he sent his columns directly into a valley surrounded by Croatian sharpshooters.

The failure of his troops to make any headway against Lacy's troops, and indeed their apparent collapse, caused Frederick to feel the battle lost, and to leave the field. Upon his departure, command devolved to Keith. Initially Keith made no headway against the Austrian front, but when Lacy was wounded, his subordinates did not have the same command vision, and Keith was able to make some progress against the Austrian front, actually rolling up the Austrian lines to the north and south of Lobositz. The overall Austrian commander, George Browne, had never intended to make this a major battle, and so withdrew the entire force to Budin, approximately eight kilometers (5 mi) away.

In 1757, he commanded at the siege of Prague and later, in this same campaign, he defended Leipzig against a greatly superior force. He was also present at Rossbach, and, while the king was fighting at Leuthen, joined with Prince Henry's force in Saxony.

=== Hochkirch ===
In 1758, Keith took a prominent part in the Moravian campaign, after which he withdrew from the army to restore his broken health. He returned in time for the autumn campaign in the Lausitz region, and was killed on 14 October 1758 at the battle of Hochkirch. He had been shot several times; the final shot knocked him off his horse into his groom's arms. The groom was dragged away, leaving Keith's body behind.

Although stripped bare by the time the Austrians found him on the battlefield the following day, he was recognised by Lacy, the son of Peter Lacy, his old commander in Russia. The Austrians gave him a decent burial on the field; his groom, who had crept back to the battlefield, observed this and marked the location. Keith was transferred shortly afterwards by Frederick to the garrison church of Berlin.

=== Relationship with Frederick ===
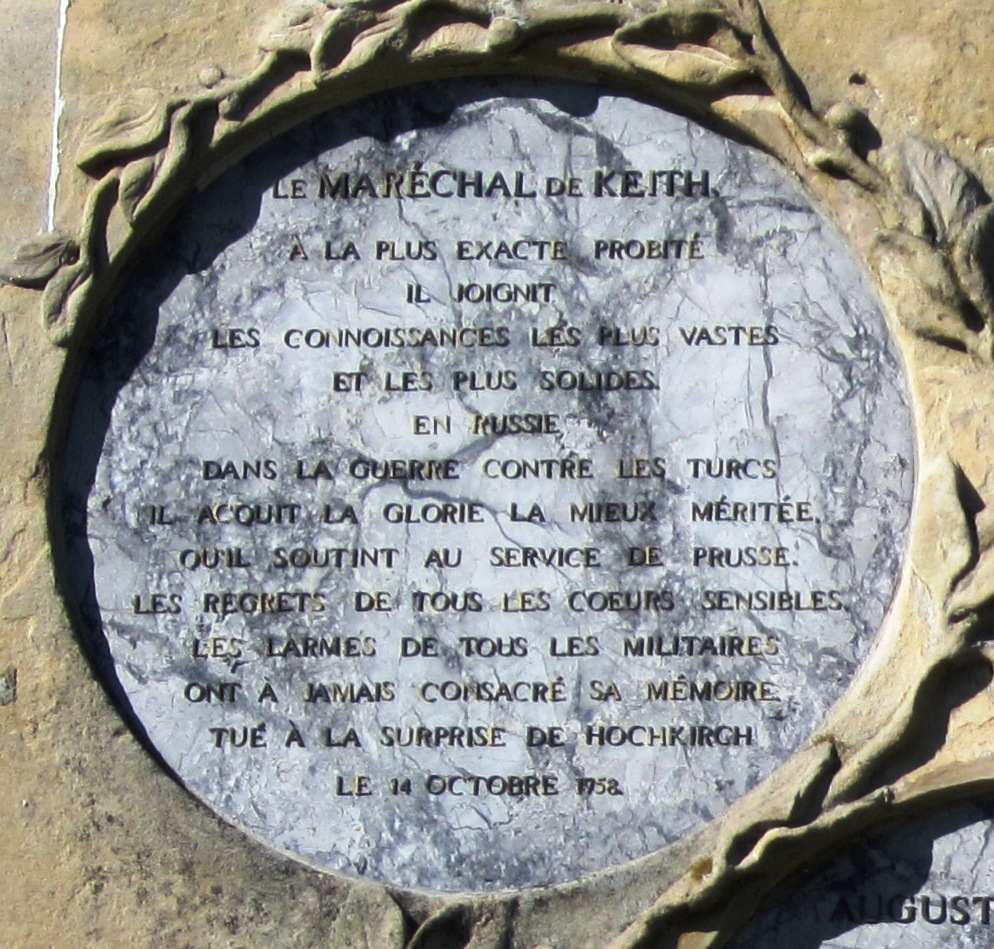
Frederick commemorated Keith on the Rheinsberg Obelisk

While at the University of Edinburgh, James Keith acquired a taste for literature and learning that secured him the esteem of the most distinguished savants of Europe. His experiences in the Jacobite uprisings, and his observations of the contentious competition between and among the clan chieftains, offered him the opportunity early to learn the pitfalls of command, the arts of negotiation, and the importance of listening and diplomacy. This skill was further sharped during the intrigues of the Russian court, where he served for 17 years. He displayed in numerous campaigns the calm, intelligent and watchful valour which was his chief characteristic.

In his personal relationships, he demonstrated calmness and loyalty. In this he was the opposite of his father, who had been described as "very wild, inconstant and passionate." In Finland, he met Eva Merthen. Although they never married, they had several children.

Keith became one of Frederick's chief allies and friends. Keith developed a game of chess for Frederick, life-sized, that the two would play; Frederick also travelled incognito with Keith throughout Germany and Hungary.

At his final battle, he had remonstrated with the king about establishing the camp at Hochkirch, with the Austrians looming in the heights around them, pointing out that staying in the village was suicide. "If the Austrians leave us unmolested in this camp", Keith told the king, "they deserve to be hanged." Frederick reportedly replied, "it is to be hoped they are more afraid of us than of the gallows." Frederick was devastated by Keith's death at Hochkirch.

== Memorials ==
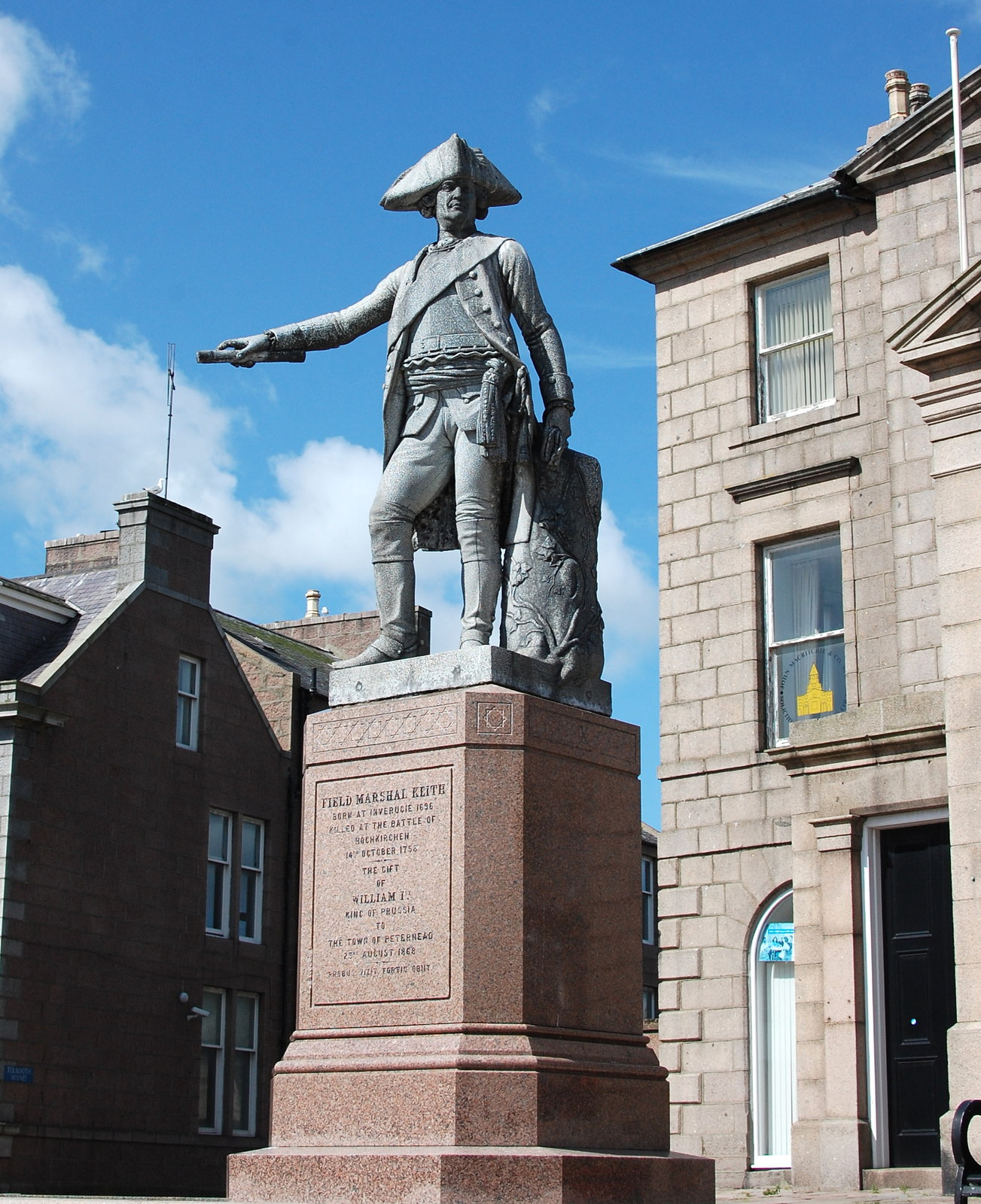
Statue to Keith in Peterhead, Scotland

Many memorials were erected to him by the king, Prince Henry, and others. He was immortalised in song as Feldmarschall von Keith in the ballad "Fridericus Rex" by Willibald Alexis, which was set to music by Carl Loewe in 1837 and became the basis in the 1860s for Ferdinand Radek's Fridericus Rex Grenadier March in which his surname is mispronounced as "Kite." He is memorialised on the Equestrian statue of Frederick the Great (1851). In 1889, the 22nd Infantry Regiment (1st Upper Silesian) was named after him. Hochkirch erected a stone tablet inscribed to Keith outside its church, to stand with others dedicated to the victims of Prussia's defeat by Austria on 14 October 1758. There is also a statue to Keith in Peterhead, Aberdeenshire, which was given to the town by William I, King of Prussia, in 1868. A former military governor of Berlin, a street bearing his name was in the centre of the city in 2004.
