= Mary Drummond =

Scottish Jacobite supporter (1675-1729)

- Countess Marischal
- Tenure: 1694–1729
- Born: 1675
- Died: March 7, 1729 (aged 53–54); Edinburgh
- Spouse: William Keith
- Father: James Drummond, 4th Earl of Perth

Mary Drummond (1675 – 1729) was a leading supporter of the Jacobites who wanted to bring a Catholic to the British throne. She became Mary, Countess Marischal in 1694. She is wrongly named as the author of the song When the King Comes O’er the Water but the song is in her voice.

== Life ==
Drummond was the daughter of James Drummond, 4th Earl of Perth, and his first wife, Lady Jane Douglas (d. 1678). Her maternal grandfather was William Douglas, 1st Marquess of Douglas. Her father was imprisoned at Kirkcaldy in December 1688. She would have been aware of her father being exiled in 1693 for Jacobitism, but she already married. Her husband William Keith became the 9th Earl Marischal in 1694.

Around 1690 Drummond married William Keith later 9th Earl Marischal. His father was George Keith, 8th Earl Marischal (d. 1694) and the courtier Lady Mary Hay (d. 1701) who was the third daughter of the 2nd Earl of Kinnoull. Her eldest son George Keith who became the tenth and the last Earl Marischal was born in 1692 or 1693. Her other son James Francis Edward Keith who was born in 1696 was named after the Old Pretender and they both became soldiers. She and her husband also had two daughters. Mary who married John, sixth earl of Wigtown and Anne who married Alexander, sixth earl of Galloway.

Drummond was buried at Holyrood Abbey after she died in Edinburgh on 7 March 1729.

== When the King Comes O’er the Water ==
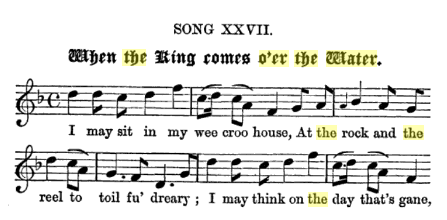
When the King Comes O’er the Water

The song When the King Comes O’er the Water is sometime thought to be written by Drummond, however the song is thought to be from after she died. The song was first published in James Hogg's Jacobite Relics of 1817.

The song finishes with "My faither was a guid Lord’s son, my mither was an Earl’s daughter / And I will be Lady Keith again, the day oor King comes o’er the water".
