= Battle of Hochkirch =

1758 battle of the Third Silesian War

- Part of the Third Silesian War
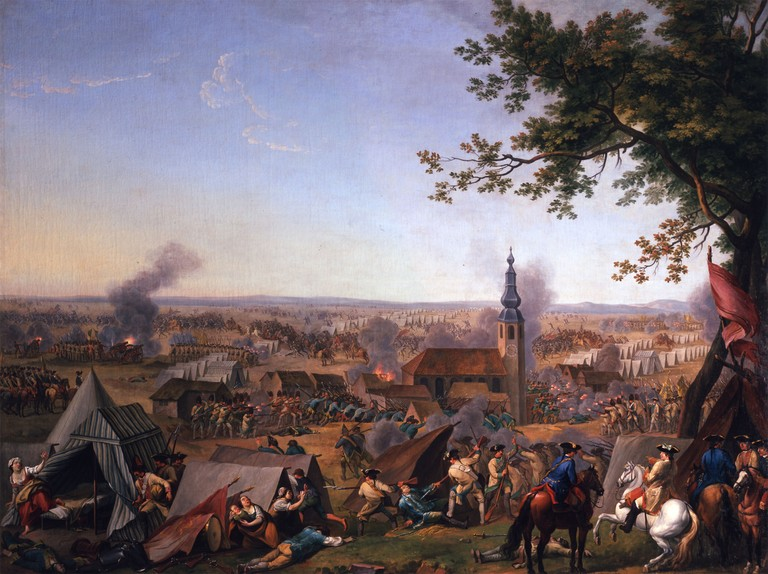
- Der Überfall bei Hochkirch am 14. Oktober 1758, Hyacinthe de la Pegna
Date	14 October 1758
Location	Hochkirch, Saxony 51.1486°N 14.5700°E
Result	Austrian victory

Belligerents
Austria	Prussia

Commanders and leaders
Leopold von Daun; Franz von Lacy; Ernst Gideon von Laudon	Frederick II; James Keith †; Hans von Ziethen; Friedrich Seydlitz

Strength
80,000	30,000–36,000

Casualties and losses
5,400 killed and wounded	9,400 killed, wounded and captured
- Location within Saxony Battle of Hochkirch (Germany) Battle of Hochkirch (Central Europe)

Frederick the Great
current battle
First Silesian War
Second Silesian War
Third Silesian War

The Battle of Hochkirch took place on 14 October 1758, during the Third Silesian War (part of the Seven Years' War). After several weeks of maneuvering for position, an Austrian army of 80,000 commanded by Lieutenant Field Marshal Leopold Josef Graf Daun surprised the Prussian army of 30,000–36,000 commanded by Frederick the Great. The Austrian army overwhelmed the Prussians and forced a general retreat. The battle took place in and around the village of Hochkirch, 9 kilometers (6 mi) east of Bautzen, Saxony.

Historians generally consider the battle as among Frederick's greatest blunders. Contrary to the advice of his subordinates, he refused to believe that the typically cautious Austrian commander Leopold von Daun would bring his troops into battle. The Austrian force ambushed his army in a pre-dawn attack. Over 30% of Frederick's army was defeated; five generals were killed, and he lost his artillery park and a vast quantity of supplies. Although Daun had scored a complete surprise, his attempt to pursue the retreating Prussians was unsuccessful. The escaped force united with another corps in the vicinity and regained momentum over the winter.

== Seven Years' War ==
Although the Seven Years' War was a global conflict, it took a specific intensity in the European theater based on the recently concluded War of the Austrian Succession (1740–1748). The 1748 Treaty of Aix-la-Chapelle gave Frederick II of Prussia, known as Frederick the Great, the prosperous province of Silesia. Empress Maria Theresa of Austria had signed the treaty to gain time to rebuild her military forces and forge new alliances; she was intent upon regaining ascendancy in the Holy Roman Empire as well as recovering the Silesian province. In 1754, escalating tensions between Britain and France in North America offered France an opportunity to break the British dominance of Atlantic trade. Seeing the opportunity to regain her lost territories and to limit Prussia's growing power, Austria put aside its old rivalry with France to form a new coalition. Britain aligned herself with the Kingdom of Prussia; this alliance drew in not only the British king's European territories held in personal union, including Hanover, but also those of his relatives in the Electorate of Brunswick-Lüneburg and the Landgraviate of Hesse-Kassel. This series of political maneuvers became known as the Diplomatic Revolution.

At the outset of the war, Frederick had one of the finest armies in Europe: his troops could fire at least four volleys a minute, and some of them could fire five. By the end of 1757, the course of the war had gone well for Prussia, and poorly for Austria. Prussia achieved spectacular victories at Rossbach and Leuthen, and reconquered parts of Silesia that had fallen to Austria. The Prussians then pressed south into Austrian Moravia. In April 1758, Prussia and Britain concluded the Anglo-Prussian Convention in which the British committed to pay Frederick an annual subsidy of £670,000. Britain also dispatched 7,000–9,000 troops (Note: Anderson says 7,000, p. 301. Szabo says 9,000, p. 179.) to reinforce the army of Frederick's brother-in-law, the Duke Ferdinand of Brunswick-Wolfenbüttel. Ferdinand evicted the French from Hanover and Westphalia and re-captured the port of Emden in March 1758; he crossed the Rhine, causing general alarm in France. Despite Ferdinand's victory over the French at the Battle of Krefeld and the brief occupation of Düsseldorf, successful maneuvering of larger French forces required him to withdraw across the Rhine.

While Ferdinand kept the French occupied, Prussia had to contend with Sweden, Russia, and Austria. There remained a possibility that Prussia could lose Silesia to Austria, Pomerania to Sweden, Magdeburg to Saxony, and East Prussia to Poland or Russia: for Prussia, this represented an entirely nightmarish scenario. By 1758, Frederick was concerned by the Russian advance from the east and marched to counter it. East of the Oder river in Brandenburg-Neumark, a Prussian army of 35,000 men fought a Russian army of 43,000 at the Battle of Zorndorf on 25 August 1758. Both sides suffered heavy casualties but the Russians withdrew, and Frederick claimed victory. At the Battle of Tornow a month later, a Swedish army repulsed the Prussian army but did not move on Berlin. By late summer, fighting had reached a draw. None of Prussia's enemies seemed willing to take the decisive steps to pursue Frederick into Prussia's heartland.

== Prelude ==
In September and early October 1758, Lieutenant Field Marshal Count Leopold Joseph von Daun and his 80,000-man army camped near the town of Stolpen. They had covered the 120 km (75 mi) from Görlitz in 10 days. Frederick had left half of his army in Pomerania near Zorndorf to make sure the Russians stayed on the defensive, and rushed south—180 km (112 mi) in seven days—with the remainder of his army to confront Daun in Saxony. Upon arrival, Frederick announced that he and his army, now totaling 45,000, were ready to knock Daun's head off. He referred to Daun as die dicke Exzellenz (the fat Excellency).

There, between Bautzen and Löbau, Frederick and Daun played their game of cat and mouse. Frederick had tried several times to draw the Austrians out of Stolpen into a battle: Daun, who seldom attacked unless he had a perfect position, had refused the bait. Frederick and his army had marched within 8 km (5 mi) of the Austrians, but Daun had pulled his army away, again, refusing to be drawn into battle. Upon the Austrian withdrawal, Frederick sent troops in pursuit; these were driven off by Daun's rearguard. In frustration, Frederick shadowed Daun by maneuvering his army toward Bautzen; while there, Frederick learned that Daun had established a camp about 5 km (3 mi) east of him in the hills directly east of Hochkirch. He dispatched an entire Prussian corps commanded by General Wolf Frederick von Retzow to those hills in late September; by early October, Retzow's corps was within 2 km (1 mi) of the Austrians. Frederick ordered Retzow to take the hill that commanded the area, called Strohmberg. When Retzow arrived there, he discovered that the Austrians already had laid possession with a strong force. Retzow chose not to attack; Frederick had him removed from command and arrested.

== Dispositions ==
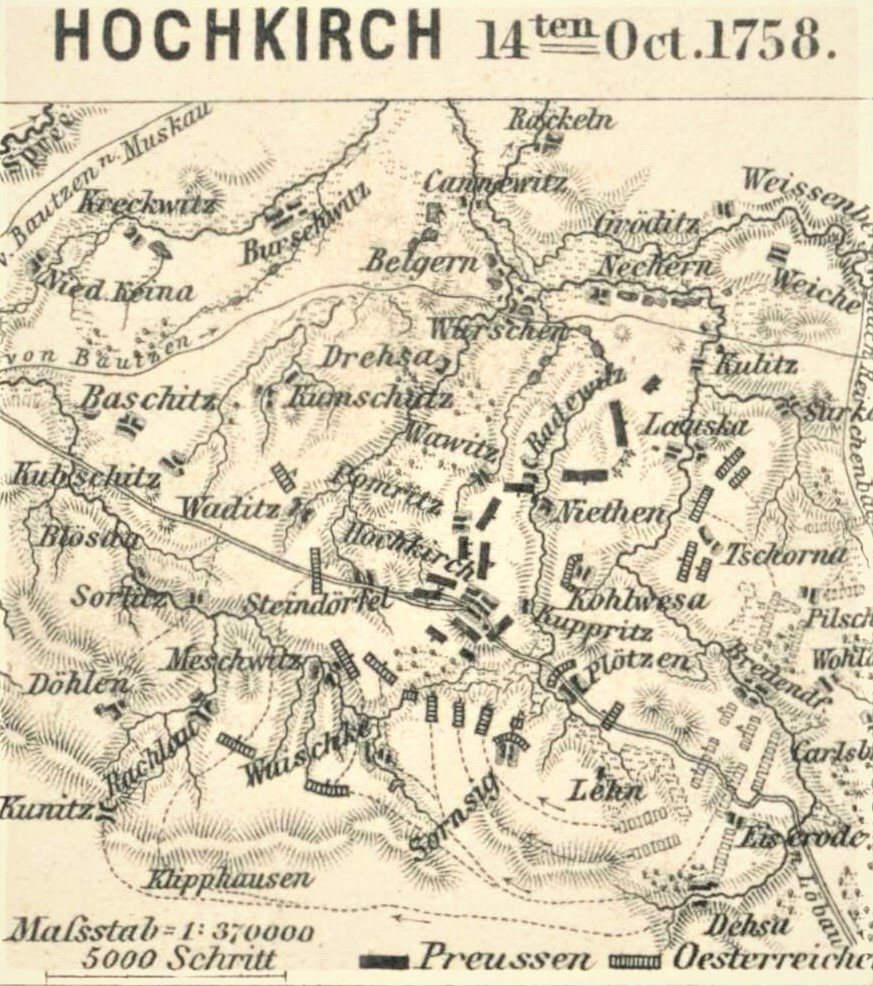
Disposition of forces on 14 October 1758

Hochkirch stands on a slight rise in terrain, surrounded by mildly undulating plains; the village can be seen from the distance, except from the south, where several heights abut the village and block visibility. The church stands near the highest point, granting visibility east, west and north.

On 10 October, Frederick marched on Hochkirch and established his own camp, extending from the town north, 5 km (3 mi) to the edge of the forest at the base of the Kuppritzerberg. Frederick did not plan to stay in the small village for an extended period, only until provisions—mostly bread—arrived from Bautzen, and then they would move eastward. To the east of the village, less than 2 km (1 mi) distant, the Austrians' presence on the hilltop increasingly made the Prussians—except Frederick—anxious about an attack. Frederick ignored the warnings of his officers, especially his trusted Field Marshal James Keith, who thought staying in the village was suicide. "If the Austrians leave us unmolested in this camp," Keith told the king, "they deserve to be hanged." Frederick reportedly replied, "it is to be hoped they are more afraid of us than of the gallows."

Instead of worrying about a possible Austrian threat, Frederick scattered his men facing eastward, the last known location of Daun's army. The troops created an S-shaped line, north to south, adjacent to Hochkirch. The weak (west) side was guarded by an outpost of nine battalions with artillery support; the principal purpose of the infantry was to maintain contact with a deployed scout unit. Eleven battalions and 28 squadrons guarded the east side. Frederick had his best soldiers garrison the village of Hochkirch. He did not believe any attack would occur; Daun's army had been dormant in recent months, refusing to be drawn into battles.

The Imperial court in Vienna criticized Daun for his failure to act; the Empress and her ministers worried that the Russians and the French would drop out of the coalition if there were no action. Daun, a cautious and diligent commander, took his time to make his plans. The Strohmberg, one of the heights abutting Hochkirch, anchored Daun's left flank, and he deployed the remainder of his force southward across the road between Bautzen and Loebau. This also gave him control of an important junction between Görlitz in the east and Zittau in the south. He anchored the far right end of his line in another wooded hill south of the road, the Kuppritzerberg, on the opposite side of the hill from the Prussians. Despite the proximity, the Prussians neither increased their security nor deployed their troops in response to the Austrian presence. The cautious Daun also took into account that his men were eager to fight a battle and that they outnumbered the Prussians by more than two-to-one. His men made a great production of hewing the trees in a nearby forest, action which Frederick interpreted as efforts to create field works, not, as it was actually intended, to build a road through the thick wood. Daun also had discovered a secret weakness of Frederick's. His own personal secretary had been sending Frederick information on Daun's plans, secreted in deliveries of eggs; upon discovering this, Daun promised the man his life in return for his cooperation in continuing to send Frederick misinformation. Daun's plan, which he had kept secret, was an early morning sweep through the woods with 30,000 specially picked troops, around Frederick's flank, to enclose him. The Prussian army would be asleep, both literally and figuratively, when the Austrian army struck.

== Battle ==
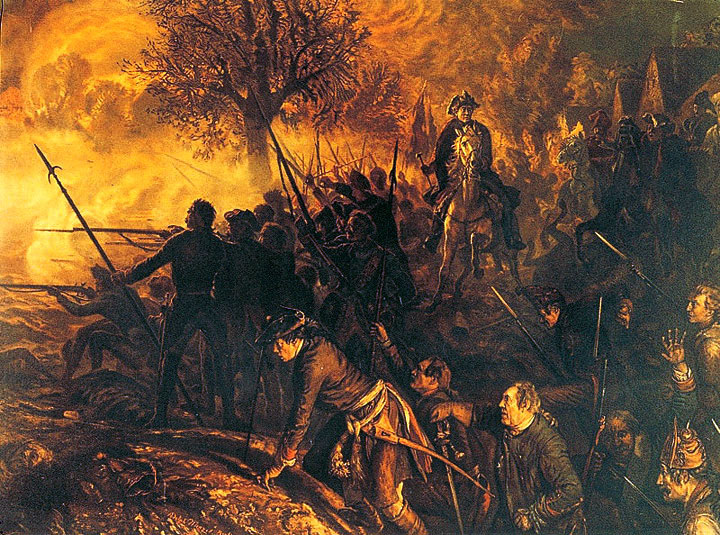
The Croats and other irregulars set fire to the village.

Daun's battle plan took the Prussians completely by surprise. The east side of Frederick's line was the first to be attacked. Using the starless night and fog as cover, and grouped into small shock units for easier control and stealth, the Austrians fell on the Prussian battery when the church bell signaled 5:00, catching the Prussians completely off guard. Many men were still sleeping, or just waking up, when the attack started. After setting fire to the village, the Croats (Note: The Pandurs, or Croats, were "irregulars" from the wrong side of the Military Frontier. There were about 1,000 pledged to Maria Theresa's aid. They had joined the Empress's cause in 1742 but had been, with difficulty, managed; by 1758 they were better integrated into the Austrian army, but they still refused to take orders from Austrian commanders, preferring their own; they could not be disciplined; they did not march in formation; and they were inclined to plunder. Bassett, pp. 94–96.) cut tent ropes, causing the canvas to fall on sleeping soldiers, then bayoneted the men as they struggled to free themselves from canvas and cords. Men tangled in the tents bled to death, in what today is still called Blutgasse, or Blood Alley.

Initially, Frederick thought the sounds of the battle were either an outpost skirmish or the Croats, who apparently started their days with regular firing of their weapons. His staff had trouble rousing him from bed, but he was soon alerted when Prussian cannons, captured by the Austrians, started to fire on his own camp.

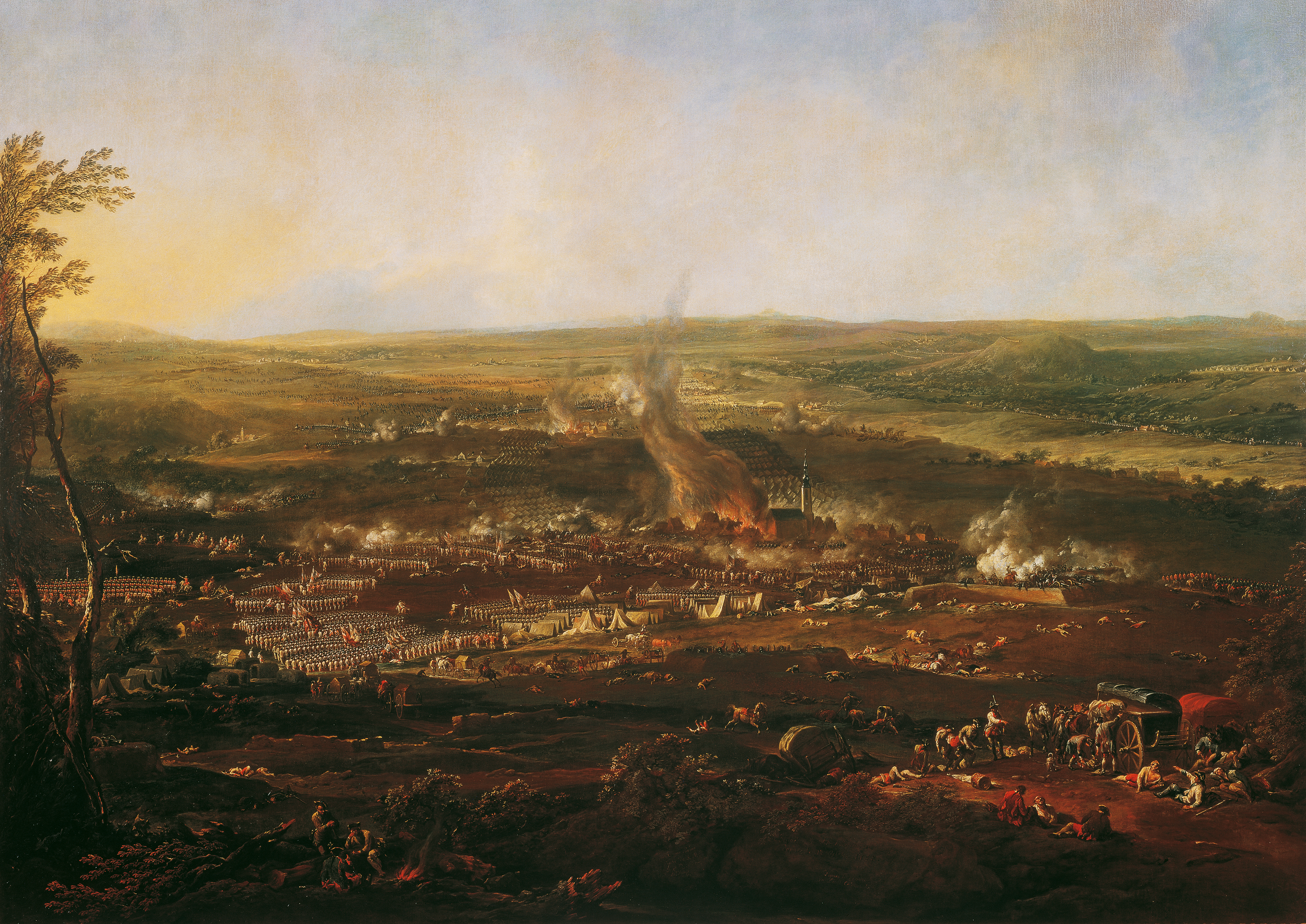
Battle of Hochkirch by Johann Christian Brand

While Frederick's adjutants were trying to wake him, his generals, most of whom had not slept and had kept their horses saddled and weapons ready, organized the Prussian resistance. Keith had anticipated an Austrian attack and organized a slashing counterattack on the Austrians holding the Prussian battery. Maurice von Anhalt-Dessau, another of Frederick's able generals, funneled the awakening troops to Keith. Combined, this action briefly retook the Prussian battery south of Hochkirch, but they could not hold it in the face of Austrian muskets. At 6:00, three more Prussian regiments rushed Hochkirch itself, while Prince Maurice continued directing stragglers and reinforcements into the counterattack. The Prussians swept through the village, out the other side, and fell on the battery at bayonet point. By that point, though, most Prussian order and cohesion had been lost. The Austrians, supported by their appropriated Prussian guns, which had not been spiked, wrought havoc on the attackers. Keith was hit mid-body and knocked out of his saddle, dead as he fell.

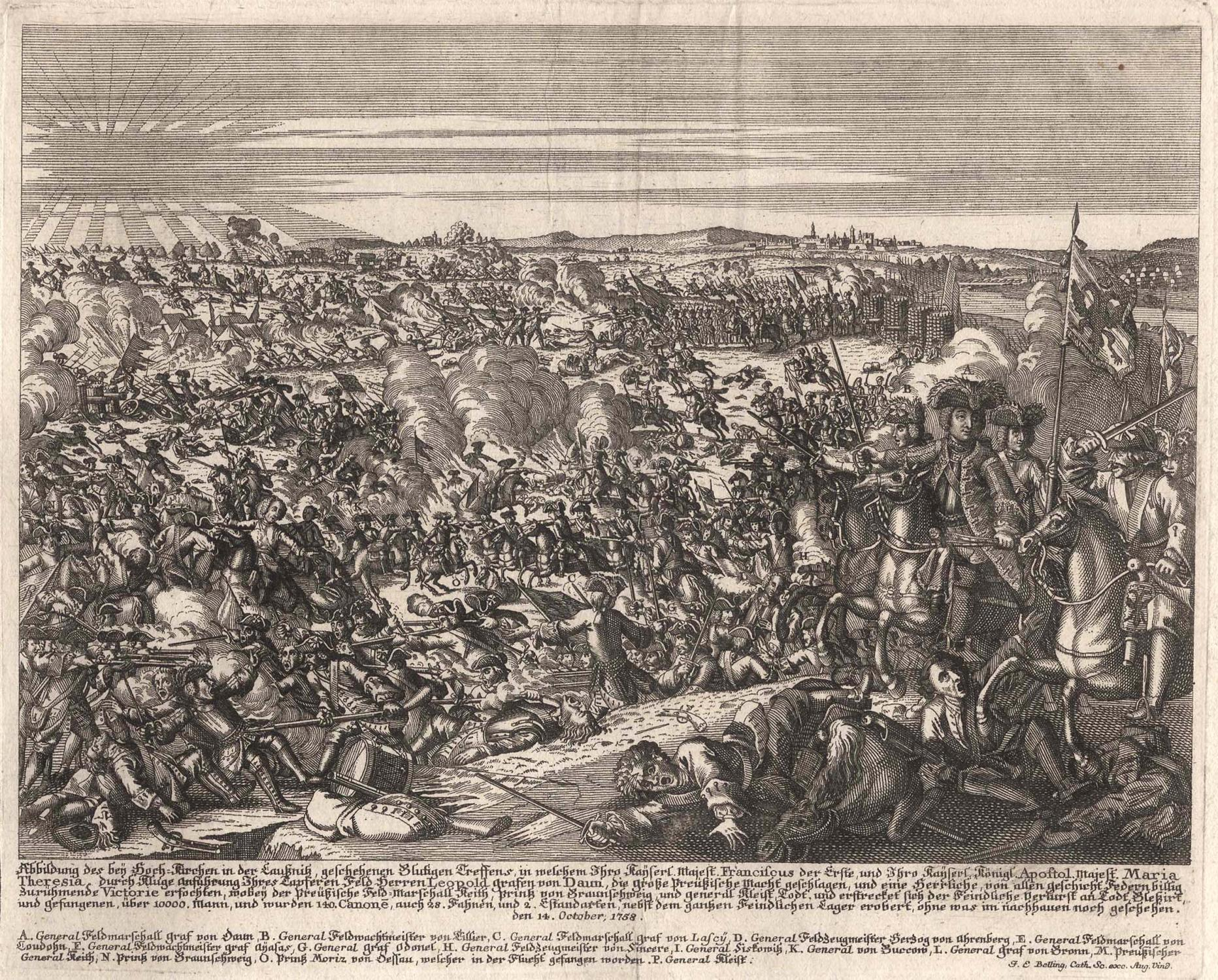
Battle of Hochkirch by Joseph Erasmus Belling

When the early morning fog had lifted, the soldiers could distinguish friend from foe. Prussian cavalry, which had remained saddled and ready throughout the night, launched a series of regimental counterattacks. A battalion of the 23rd Infantry charged, but withdrew as it was surrounded flank and rear. The church yard, a walled stronghold, diverted the Austrians; Major Siegmund Moritz William von Langen's musketeers of the 19th regiment held it with determination and provided safety for retreating Prussians. Most importantly, Langen bought time.

By this time fully awake, Frederick hoped that the battle could be retrieved and returned to the village to take command. At 7:00, finding his infantry milling about in the village, Frederick ordered them to advance, sending reinforcements commanded by Prince Francis of Brunswick-Wolfenbüttel, his brother-in-law, with them. As Francis approached the village, Austrian cannon-fire sheared his head off his shoulders; his troops faltered, demoralized by the sight of the prince's headless body atop his spooked horse. Frederick himself helped to rally Francis' shaken troops.

By 7:30, the Austrians had retaken the burning village, but their hold on it was tenuous. Keith and Prince Francis were dead. General Karl von Geist lay among the injured. Maurice von Anhalt-Dessau had been injured and captured. By 9:00, the Prussian left wing began to collapse under the weight of the Austrian assault; the last Prussian battery was overrun and turned against them. Led by the King, they advanced against five Austrian companies of hussars commanded by Franz Moritz von Lacy. Within a dozen yards of the Austrian line of infantry, Frederick's horse was killed. His own hussars rescued him from capture.

As he withdrew, Frederick established a fighting line north of the village, and it eventually served as a rallying point for stragglers and survivors. By mid-morning, around 10:00, the Prussians retreated to the north-west. Any pursuing troops were met with a wall of musket fire. Frederick and his surviving army were out of range of the Austrian army by the time they had reorganized. Hans Joachim von Zieten and Friedrich Wilhelm von Seydlitz, who also had remained alert all night, organized a rear guard action that prevented the Austrians from falling upon the retreating Prussians. This discouraged even the most determined Austrians; the Croats and irregulars contented themselves with pillaging the village and the Prussian bodies.

== Aftermath ==
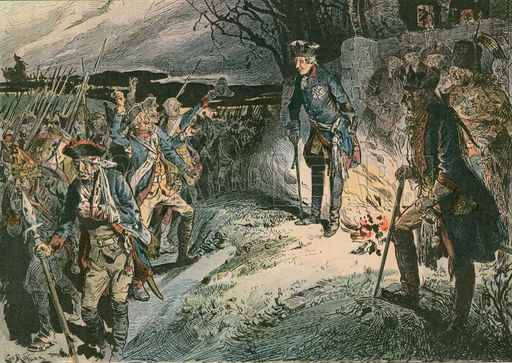
Frederick the Great and his soldiers retreat after the Battle of Hochkirch in 1758, by Carl Röchling.

In five hours, Frederick lost 9,400 of the 30,000 men he brought into the battle, more than 30 percent of his army, including five generals, (Note: In addition to Keith and Frederick's brother-in-law, who were killed outright, General Karl Ferdinand von Hagen died from his injuries three months later; Hans Caspar von Krockow died from his injuries on 25 February 1759; Maurice of Anhalt Saxony, captured, was badly injured, and never led an army again. See Blanning, pp. 251–253. Wolf Frederick von Retzow, who had been relieved prior to the battle, was suffering from dysentery and died 5 November 1758 at Schweidnitz. See Bernhard von Poten, Retzow, Wolf Friedrich von, ADB, vol. 28, pp. 277–278.) 101 guns, and nearly all the tents. Frederick required his generals to set an example of courage and leadership: they led from the front. The same rate of attrition applied throughout the officer corps, which lost half of its strength in the first three campaigns of the war. In addition to human losses, they lost valuable horses and draft animals, 70 munitions wagons, and, a blow to morale, 28 flags, and two standards. On the positive side, Retzow's corps of about 6,000 men, which had not arrived in time to participate in the fighting, remained intact; Frederick had pulled his troops together for an orderly retreat; and the King retained the confidence of his soldiers.

The Austrians suffered casualties and losses at about three percent. According to the Austrian historian Gaston Bodart, there were fewer troops participating than most modern sources suggest: he places Austrian participants at 60,000, losses in casualties at 5,400, approximately 8.3 percent, but other losses (to injuries, desertions and capture) at about 2,300, or 3.6 percent. They also lost three standards. Some modern historians place the overall losses higher, at 7,300. Notification of the battle arrived in Vienna during the celebration of the Empress's name day, to the delight of Maria Theresa and her court, gathered at Schönbrunn Palace. Daun received a blessed sword and hat from Pope Clement XIII, a reward usually granted for defeating "infidels". The Empress eventually created an endowment of 250,000 florins for Daun and his heirs.

For Daun and Lacy, it was a victory of mixed emotions; upon the discovery of Keith's body in the village church, they both broke down in tears of grief. Keith had been the best friend of Lacy's father during his service in Russia. Similarly, the grief Frederick felt at the loss of one of his greatest friends was intense. His grief was added to when he learned a couple of days later that his beloved elder sister, Wilhelmine, who had shared their father's wrath in 1730 during the Katte affair, had died on the same day. He sulked in his tent for a week. At one point, he showed his librarian a small box of opium capsules, 18 in total, that he could use to "journey to a dark place from which there was no return." Despite having rescued his army from catastrophe, he remained depressed and suicidal.

Although Frederick demonstrated good leadership by rallying his troops against the surprise attack, Hochkirch is considered one of his worst losses, and it badly shook his equanimity. Andrew Mitchell, the British envoy who was with them, and normally wrote positively about Frederick, attributed Frederick's loss to the contempt he had for Daun's supposedly cautious nature and his unwillingness to give credit to intelligence that did not agree with what he imagined was true: according to Mitchell, there was no one to blame but himself. That winter, Mitchell described the 46-year-old Frederick as "an old man lacking half of his teeth, with greying hair, without gaiety or spark or imagination." Frederick suffered from gout and influenza, and refused to change his uniform, which was moth-eaten and covered in food and snuff stains.

However, the situation could have been far worse for Frederick. The fabled discipline of his army held up: once the Prussians were out of the burning village, unit cohesion and discipline returned. Their discipline neutralized any strategic advantage the Austrians could have gained, and Daun's hesitation nullified the rest. Instead of following Frederick, or cutting off Retzow's division, which had not participated in the battle, Daun withdrew to the heights and positions he had occupied before the battle, so that his men might have a good rest under blankets after the fatigue of the day. After staying there for six days, they marched out in stealth to take up a new position between Belgern and Jesewitz, while Frederick remained at Doberschütz. Ultimately, the costly Austrian victory decided nothing.

The Austrian failure to follow up with Frederick meant that the Prussians lived to fight another day. Daun took great criticism for this, but not from the people who mattered the most, the Empress and her minister Kaunitz. For Frederick, instead of having the war decided at Hochkirch, he had the opportunity over the winter to rebuild his army. In two years of fighting (1756–1757) Frederick had lost over 100,000 soldiers to death, wounds, capture, disease and desertion. By Hochkirch, many regiments were only half-disciplined. In the winter after Hochkirch, he could only replace his soldiers with untrained men, many of whom would be foreigners and prisoners-of-war; he would be starting 1759 with a half-trained army of recruits, and seasoned soldiers who were exhausted by the slaughter. The only way he could hire men would be with British gold.

Frederick's reputation for aggressiveness meant he could still terrify the Austrians simply by showing up. On 5 November, the anniversary of his great victory at Rossbach, Frederick marched toward Neisse, causing the Austrians to abandon their siege. A few weeks later, as Frederick marched further west, Daun took the entire army into winter quarters in Bohemia. Consequently, despite major losses, at the end of the campaign year, Frederick remained in possession of Saxony and Silesia, and his name remained feared in at least that part of Europe.

== Memorials ==
A granite monument, inlaid with a bronze plaque, was erected by the inhabitants of Hochkirch in memory of "Generalfeldmarschall Jacob von Keith" and his achievement. The inscription reads "Suffering, Misery, Death."

Memorials
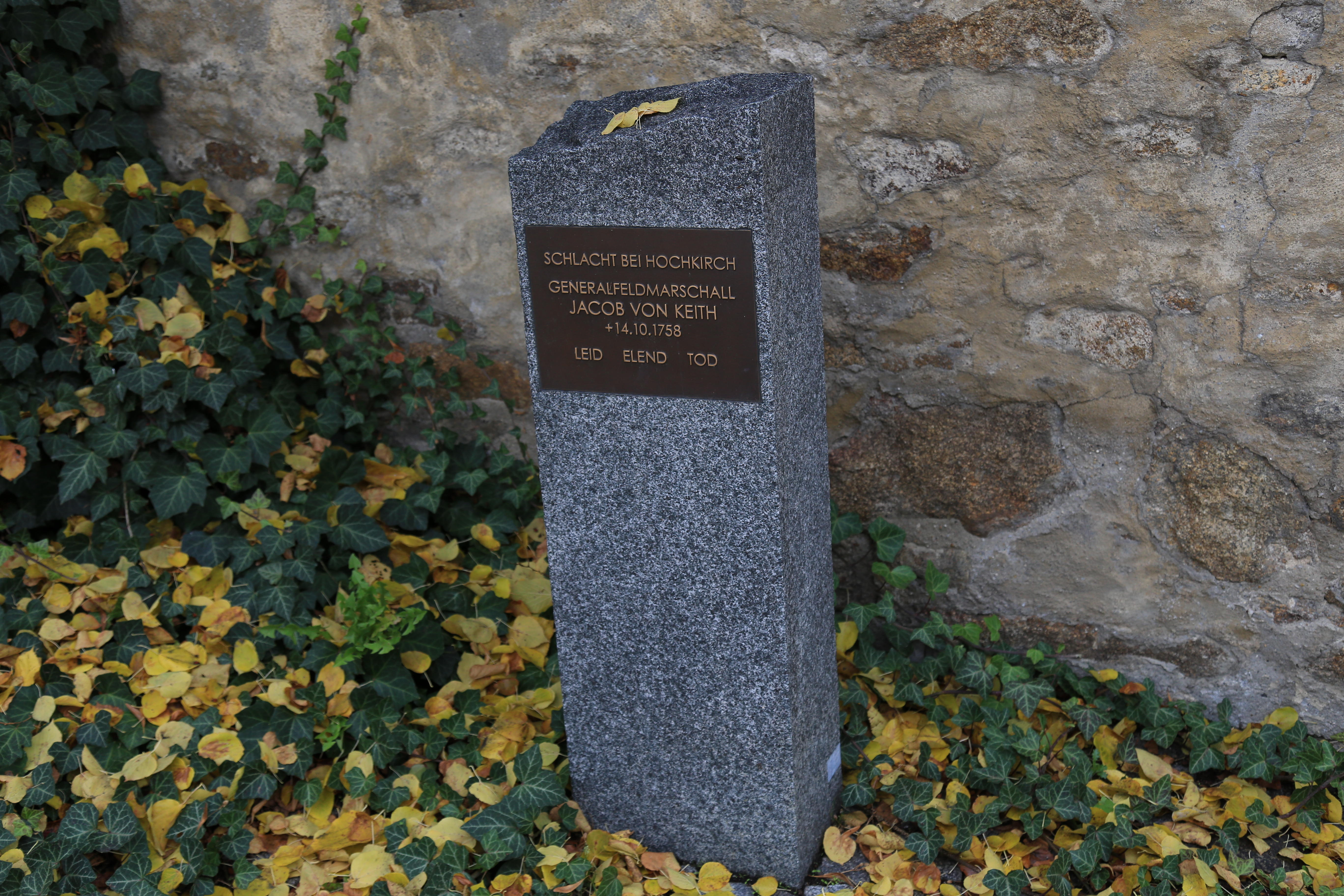
A memorial to James (Jacob) Keith stands in the village.

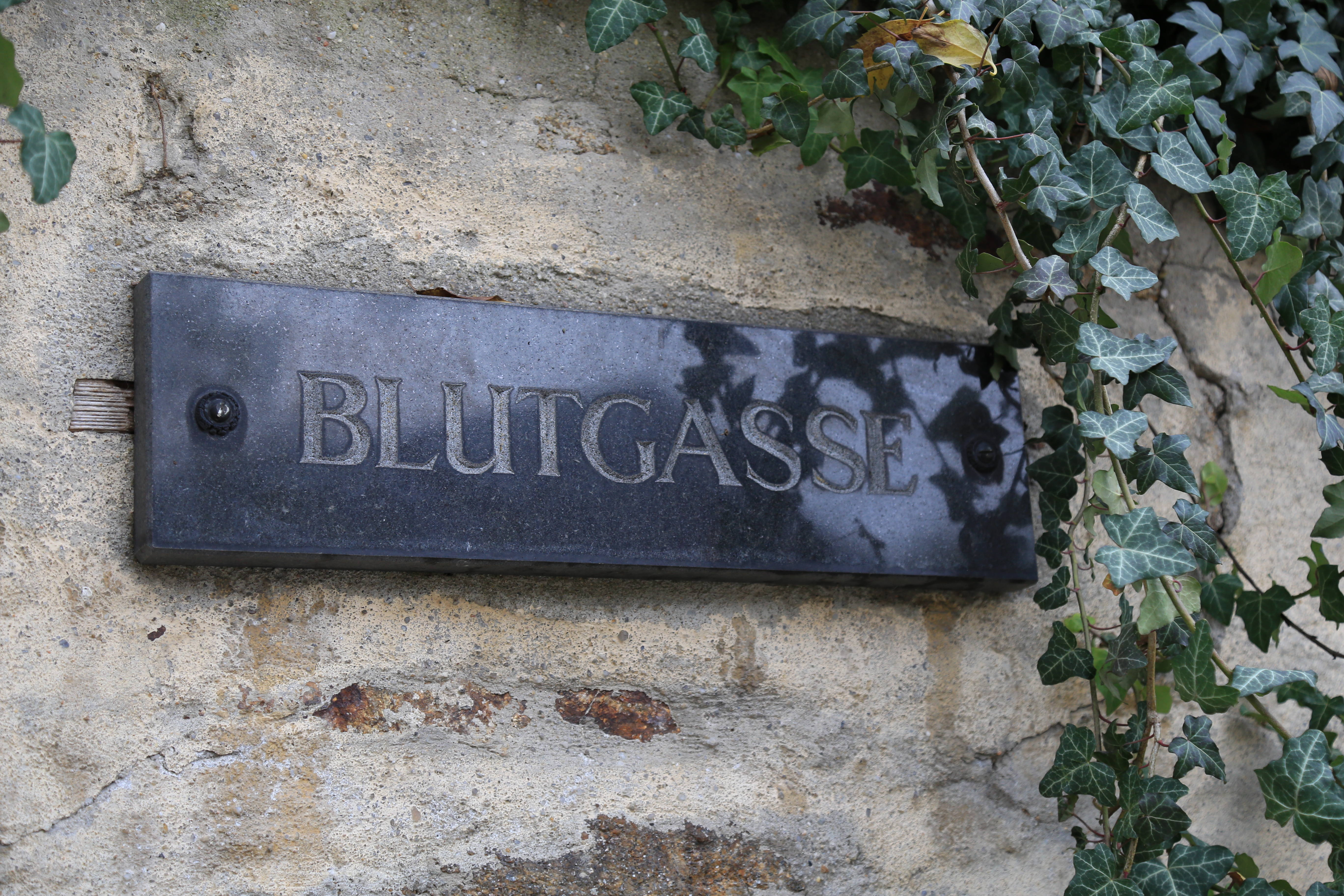
The soldiers bayoneted in their tents. Blood ran through the gutters in streams. Today, the alleyway is called Blutgasse.

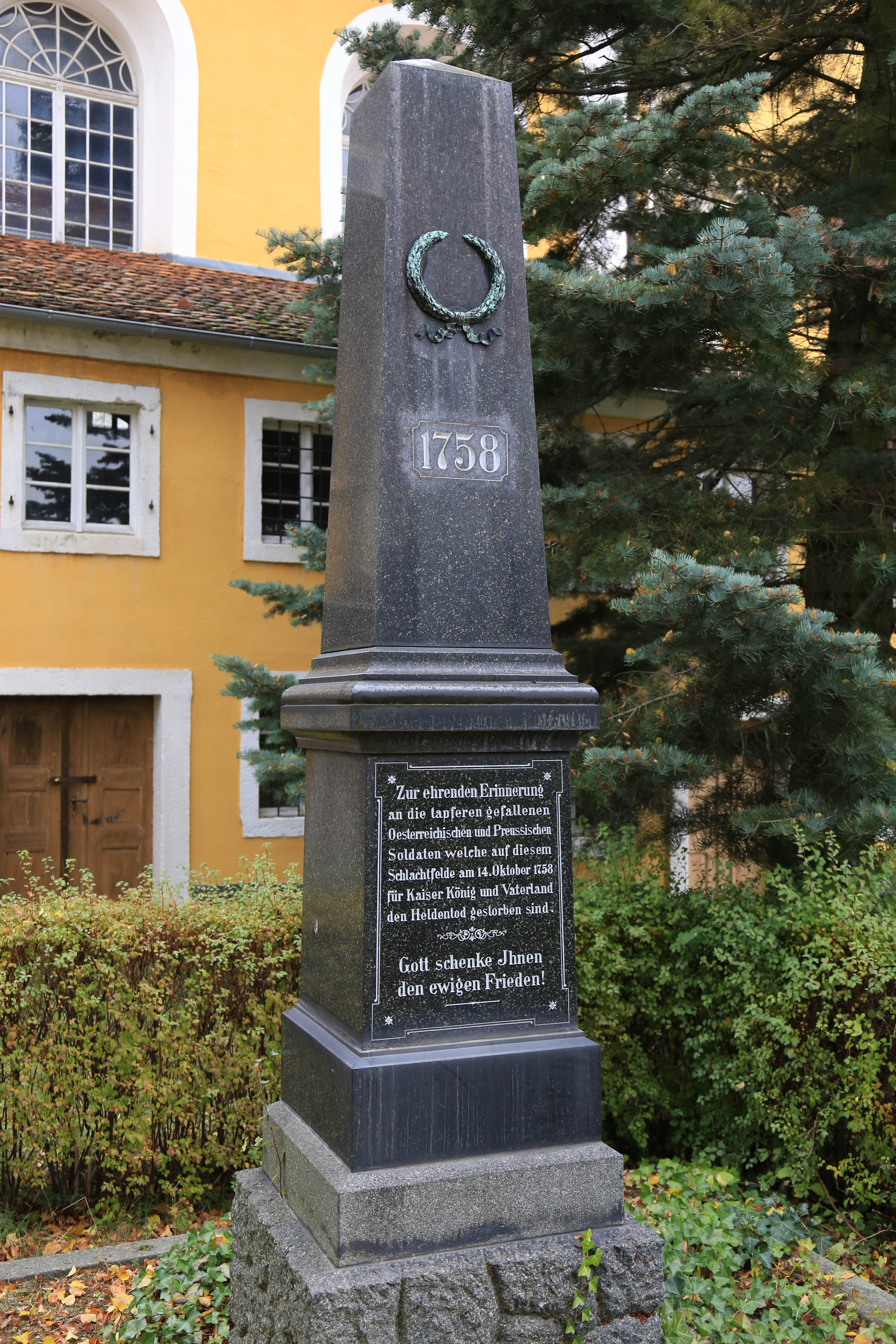
Memorial to the soldiers commanded by Siegmund (Simon) von Langen in the Hochkirch cemetery
Hochkirch and environs
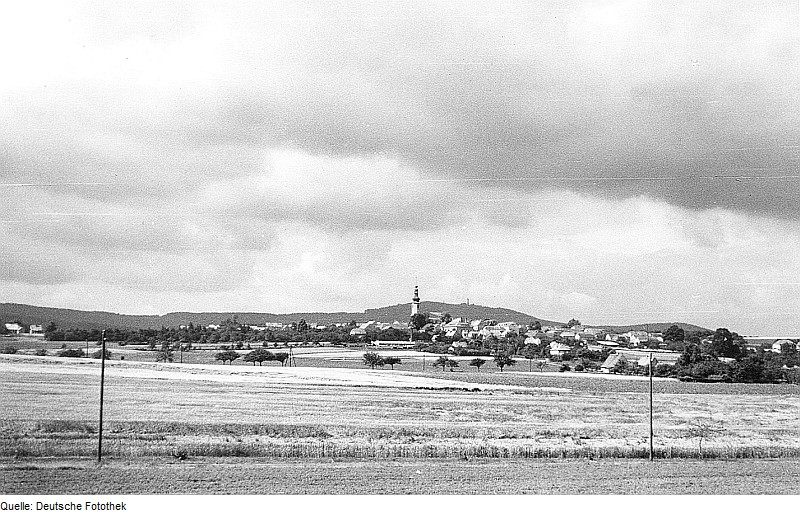
View from the Mill toward the village

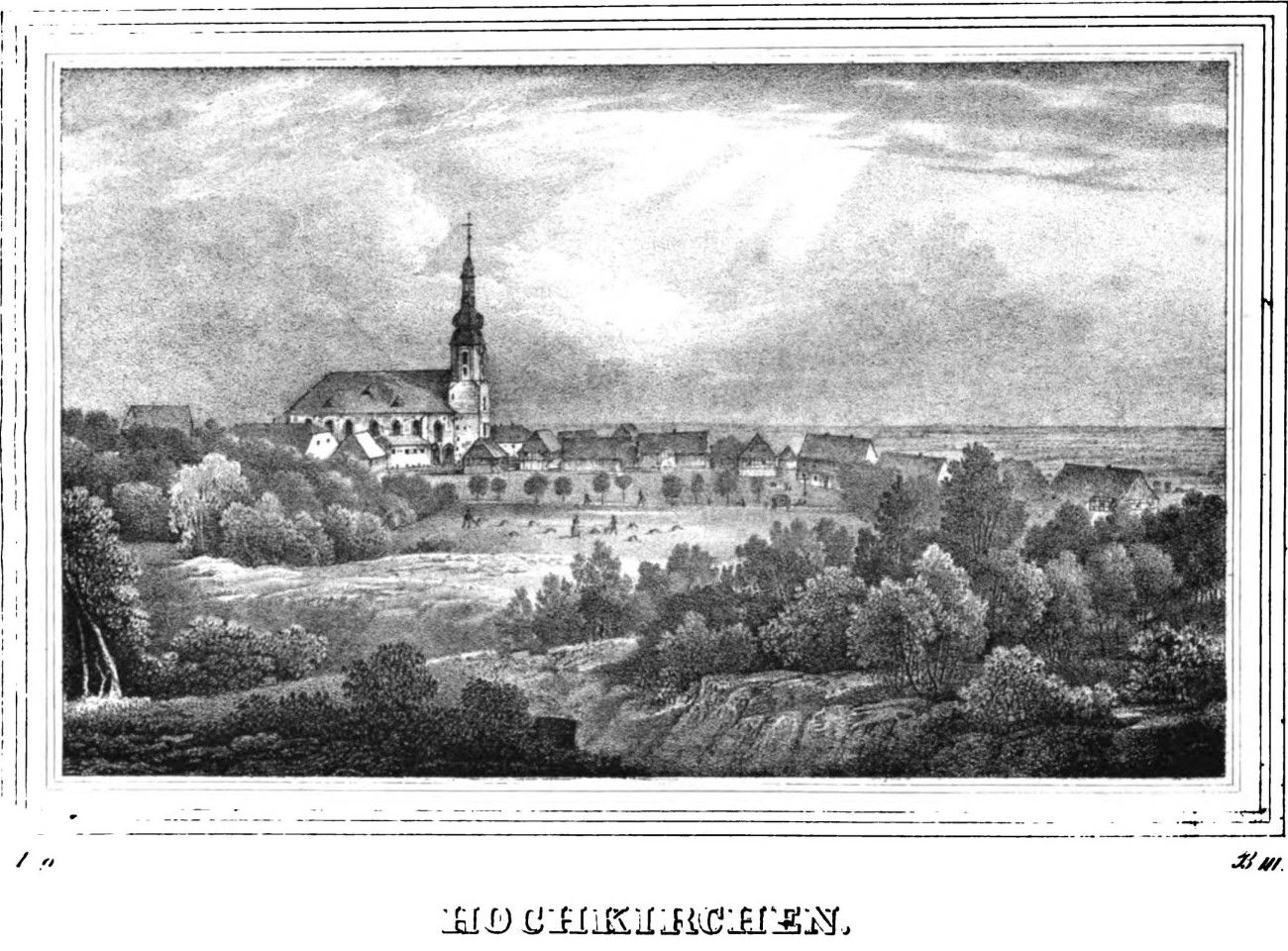
Hochkirch, on the hilltop, is visible for miles.

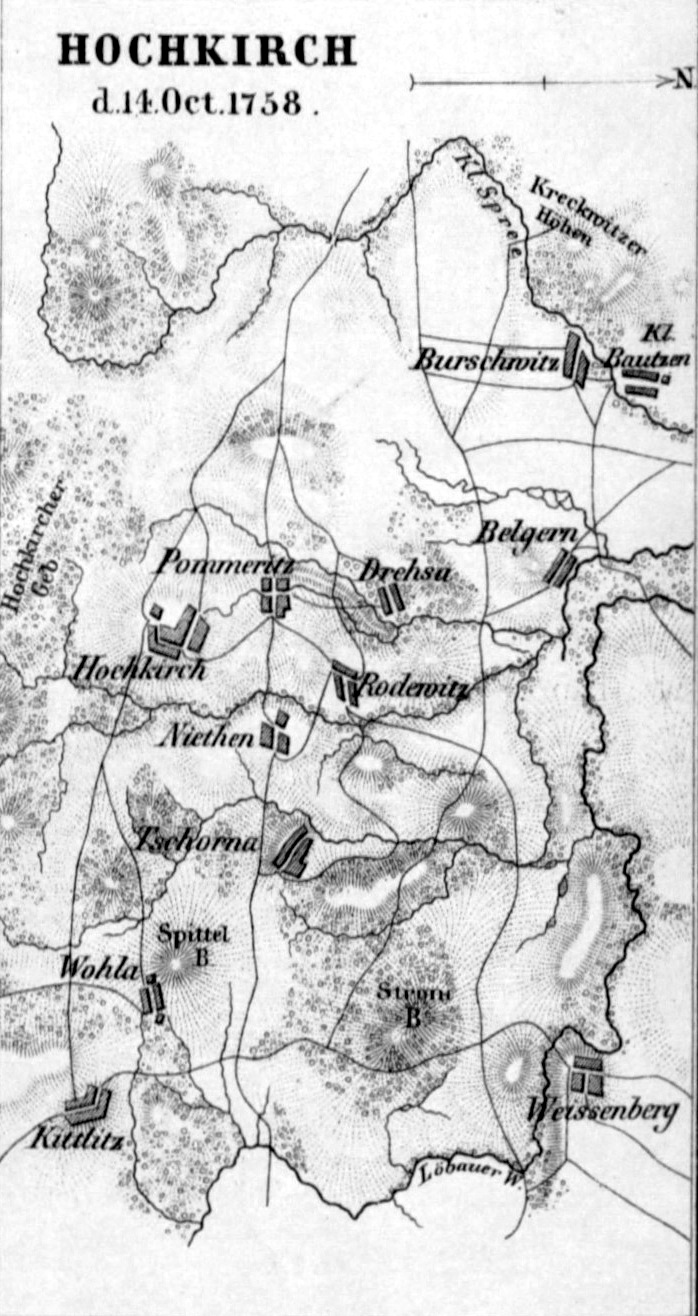
Map showing layout of Hochkirch and the region

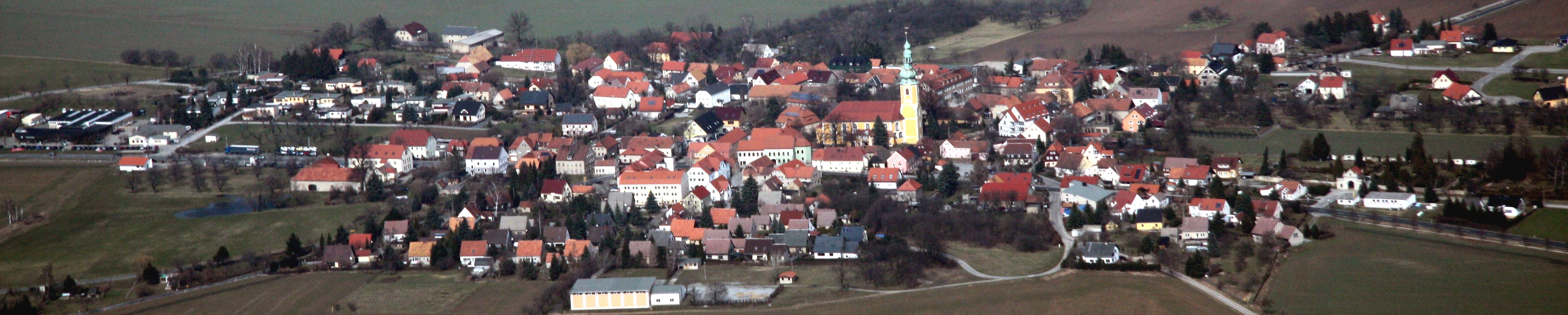
Panorama of landscape at Hochkirch. The village today is larger than in 1758, but the church, still central, and the crowded center of the village is still visible.

== Sources ==
=== Bibliography ===
- Anderson, Fred. Crucible of War: The Seven Years' War and the Fate of Empire in British North America, 1754–1766. Knopf Doubleday Publishing Group, 2007, ISBN 978-0-307-42539-3.
- Asprey, Robert. Frederick the Great: A Magnificent Enigma. Ticknor & Fields, 2007, ISBN 0-89919-352-8
- Bassett, Richard. For God and Kaiser: The Imperial Austrian Army, 1619–1918. Yale University Press, 2015. ISBN 978-0-300-21310-2
- Berenger, Jean.The Habsburg Empire 1700–1918. Routledge, 2014, ISBN 978-1-317-89573-2
- Black, Jeremy. Essay and Reflection: On the 'Old System' and the 'Diplomatic Revolution' of the Eighteenth Century. International History Review. (1990) 12:2 pp. 301–323
- Blanning, Tim. Frederick the Great, King of Prussia. New York: Random House, 2016, ISBN 978-0-8129-8873-4
- Bodart, Gaston. Losses of Life in Modern Wars, Austria-Hungary. Clarendon Press, 1916 OCLC 875334380
- Duffy, Christopher. Frederick the Great: A Military Life. New York: Routledge, Chapman & Hall, 1985. ISBN 978-0-689-11548-6
- Horn, D.B. "The Diplomatic Revolution" in J.O. Lindsay, ed., The New Cambridge Modern History vol. 7, The Old Regime: 1713–63 (1957): pp 449–64
- Jones, Archer. The Art of War in the Western World. University of Illinois Press, 2001, ISBN 978-0-252-06966-6
- Longman, Frederick William. Frederick the Great and the Seven Years' War. Longman, Green, and Company, 2012 (1881). ISBN 978-1-245-79345-2
- Malleson, Col. G. B. Loudon: A Sketch Of The Military Life Of Gideon Ernest. Pickle Partners Publishing, 2016 (1872) ISBN 978-1-78625-963-9
- Redman, Herbert J. Frederick the Great and the Seven Years' War, 1756–1763. McFarland, 2014, ISBN 978-0-7864-7669-5
- Ralli, Augustus. Guide to Carlisle. G. Allen & Unwin Limited, 1962 (1922) OCLC 805014152
- (in German) Robitschek, Norbert. Hochkirch: Eine Studie. Verlag von teufens, Wien 1905 OCLC 613088592
- Showalter, Dennis, Frederick the Great, a Military History. Frontline, 2012. ISBN 978-1-78303-479-6
- Simms, Brendan. Europe: The Struggle for Supremacy, 1453–present. Basic Books, 2013, ISBN 978-0-465-06595-0
- Szabo, Franz J. The Seven Years War in Europe: 1756–1763. Routledge, 2013. ISBN 978-1-317-88697-6
- Wilson, Peter H., The Heart of Europe: A History of the Holy Roman Empire. Penguin, 2016, ISBN 978-0-674-05809-5
- Zabecki, David. Germany at War: 400 Years of Military History (2014). Vol. I−IV, ABC-CLIO ISBN 978-1-59884-980-6

=== Further reading ===
- Battle of Hochkirch – Chapter 14 of Thomas Carlyle's History of Friedrich II.
- Fowler, William M. Empires at War: the Seven Years' War and the Struggle for North America. D & M Publishers, 2009, ISBN 978-1-926706-57-3
- Hamack, Chuck and Engling, Erik, The Battle of Hochkirch, 14 October 1758
- Lindsay, Colin. (ed) Extracts from Colonel Tempelhoffe's History of the Seven Years War, T. Cadell, 1793. OCLC 6631249
- Marston, Daniel, The Seven Years' War. Routledge, 17 June 2013 ISBN 978-1-135-97517-3
- Rickard, J. (17 November 2000), Battle of Hochkirch, Military History Encyclopedia of the Web. Accessed 23 January 2017.
