= William Keith, 9th Earl Marischal =

Scottish politician

The Right Honourable The Earl Marischal
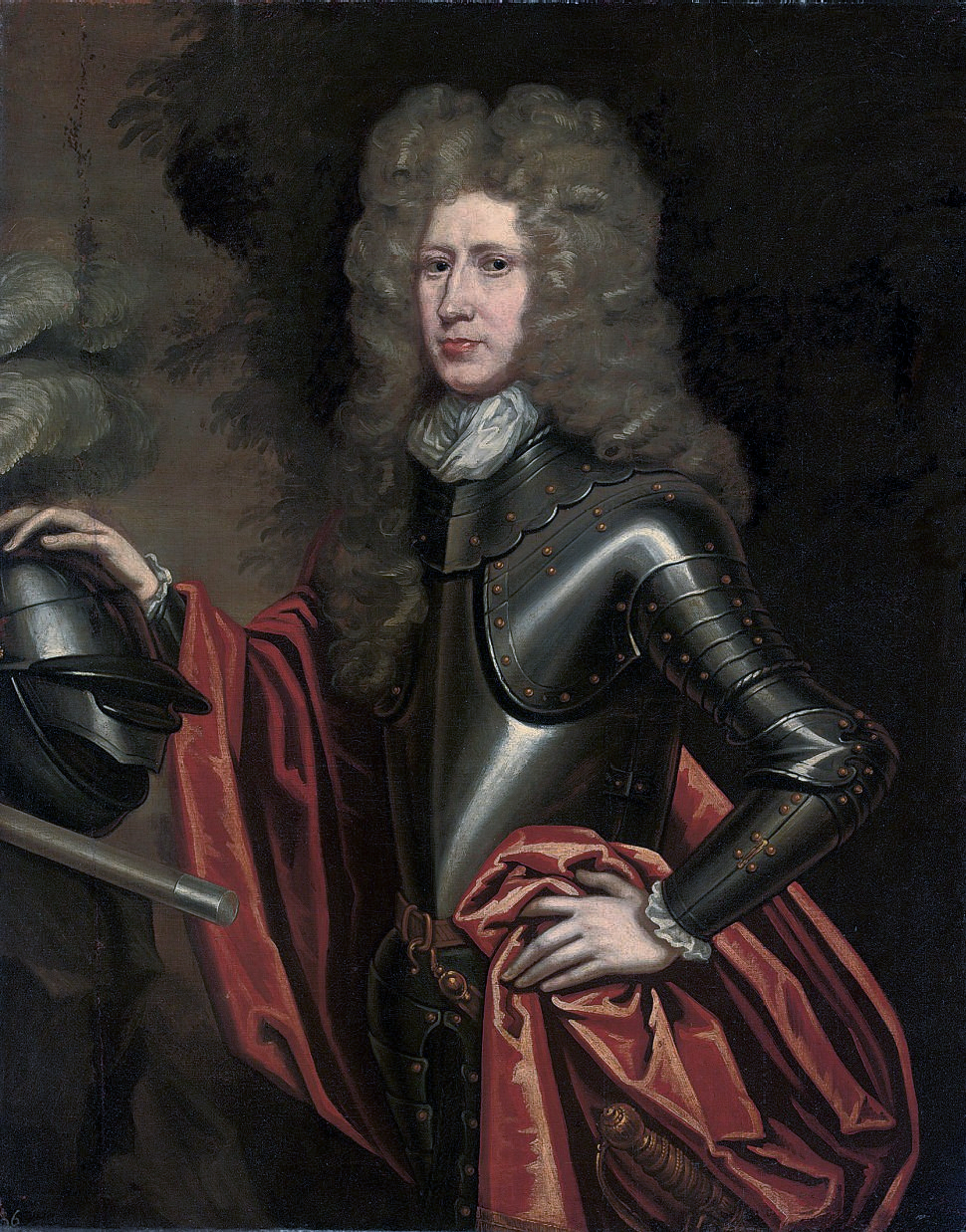
- Born: c. 1664; Scotland
- Died: 27 May 1712 (aged 47–48); London, England
- Spouse: Mary Drummond
- Children: 4

William Keith, 9th Earl Marischal, KT (c. 1664 – 27 May 1712) was a Scottish politician. He married the committed Jacobite Mary Drummond.

== Life ==
His parents were the army officer George Keith, 8th Earl Marischal (d. 1694) and the courtier Lady Mary Hay (d. 1701), third daughter of the 2nd Earl of Kinnoull. Keith succeeded to the earldom in March 1694, swore loyalty to the de facto monarchy, took up his seat in Scotland's parliament in July 1698, was sworn into the privy council in June 1701 and made a knight of the Thistle by James Francis Edward Stuart in 1705. However, he was imprisoned in Edinburgh Castle for Jacobitism during the 1708 rising then sent to London for trial once it was over, but still managed to be made one of 16 Scottish representative peers at Westminster from 1710 to 1712. He was anti-Union and Tory in political sympathies and founded a medicine chair at Marischal College in Aberdeen (though he did not endow it). John Macky described him as:

very wild, inconstant and passionate; does everything by starts; hath abundance of flashy wit, and by reason of his quality, hath good interest in the country; all Courts endeavour to have him at their side for he gives himself liberty of talking when he is not pleased with the Government. He is a thorough Libertine, yet sets up mightily for Episcopy; a hard drinker; a thin body; a middle stature; ambitious of popularity.

== Marriage and issue ==
Around 1690 Keith married the committed Jacobite Mary Drummond, daughter of James Drummond, 4th Earl of Perth (1648–1716), and his first wife, Lady Jane Douglas (d. 1678), the fourth daughter of William Douglas, 1st Marquess of Douglas. Mary did not join her father when he was exiled in 1693 for Jacobitism. Their children were:

- George Keith, later tenth and last Earl Marischal (1692/93-1778)
- James Francis Edward Keith (1696–1758), named after the 'Old Pretender'
- Mary (d. 1721), married John, sixth earl of Wigtown
- Anne (d. 1728), married Alexander, sixth earl of Galloway

== Arms ==
Coat of arms of the Earl Marischal
Crest A Hart's Head erased proper armed with ten Tynes Or. Escutcheon Argent on a Chief Gules three Palets Or; behind the shield two Baton Gules semy of Thistles ensigned on the top with an Imperial Crown Or placed saltirewise being the insignia of the office of Great Marischal of Scotland. Supporters On either side a Hart proper attired as in the Crest. Motto Veritas Vincit (Truth conquers)

== Notes ==
Peerage of Scotland
Preceded by George Keith	Earl Marischal; 1694–1712	Succeeded by George Keith
