= Hochkirch =

Hochkirch/Bukecy
- Municipality
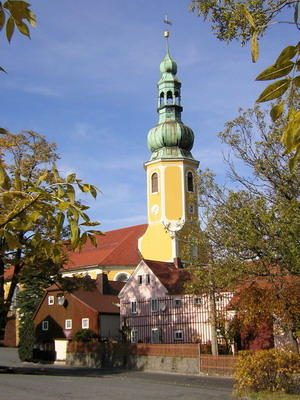
- Parish church

- Coat of arms

- Location of Hochkirch/Bukecy within Bautzen district
- Interactive map of Hochkirch/Bukecy
- Location within Germany Location within Saxony
- Coordinates: 51°9′N 14°35′E
- Country: Germany
- State: Saxony
- District: Bautzen
- Subdivisions: 18

Government
  - Mayor (2022–29): Thomas Meltke

Area
  - Total: 41.73 km^{2} (16.11 sq mi)
- Elevation: 290 m (950 ft)

Population (2025-12-31)
  - Total: 2,161
  - Density: 51.79/km^{2} (134.1/sq mi)
- Time zone: UTC+01:00 (CET)
  - Summer (DST): UTC+02:00 (CEST)
- Postal codes: 02627
- Dialling codes: 035939
- Vehicle registration: BZ, BIW, HY, KM
- Website: www.hochkirch.de

Hochkirch (German: [ˈhoːxkɪʁç]) or Bukecy (Upper Sorbian: [ˈbukɛtsɨ]) is a municipality in the district of Bautzen, in Saxony, Germany. It is known for the 1758 Battle of Hochkirch, part of the Seven Years' War.

The municipality (except Breitendorf) is part of the recognised Sorbian settlement area in Saxony. Upper Sorbian has an official status next to German, all villages bear names in both languages.

== Geography ==
Hochkirch is located in the historic Upper Lusatia region, about 10 km (6.2 mi) east of the administrative capital Bautzen and 9 km (5.6 mi) northwest of Löbau. Situated within the Lusatian Highlands, it belongs to the settlement area of the Sorbs.

== History ==
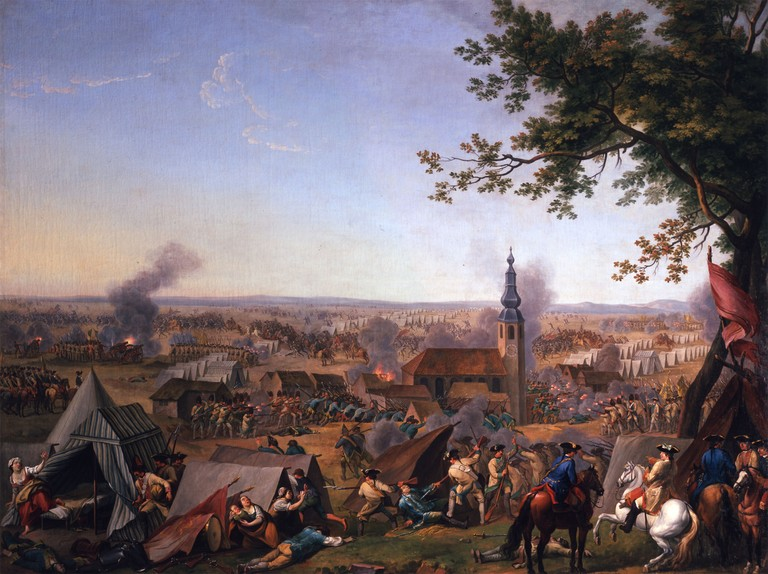
Battle of Hochkirch, painting, c. 1759/60

The village of Bukovici (possibly derived from Upper Sorbian buk: "beech") was first mentioned in a 1222 deed issued by Bishop Bruno II of Meissen; the present German name first appeared in 1368. By the 1635 Peace of Prague, the area passed to the Electorate of Saxony.

During the Seven Years' War on 14 October 1758, the Habsburg (Austrian) Imperial Army under Field Marshal Count Leopold Joseph von Daun attacked the Prussian forces of King Frederick II in a gruesome dawn attack in which many soldiers were bayonetted in their tents in an alleyway beside the village cemetery, called Blutgasse (Blood Alley). The Prussians suffered a bitter defeat; Frederick's field marshal James Francis Edward Keith was killed in battle; his brother-in-law was decapitated by a cannonball. The church yard and church were the scene of intense fighting and the doors of the Baroque Hochkirch parish church still show pock marks from musket balls.

== Politics ==
Seats in the municipal assembly (Gemeinderat) as of 2014 local elections:

- Free Voters: 7
- Christian Democratic Union of Germany (CDU): 6
- The Left: 1

== Notable people ==
- Kito Lorenc (1938–2017), Sorbian writer, lyric poet and translator.
