= George Keith, 10th Earl Marischal =

Scottish-born army officer and diplomat (1692–1778

The Right Honourable The Earl Marischal
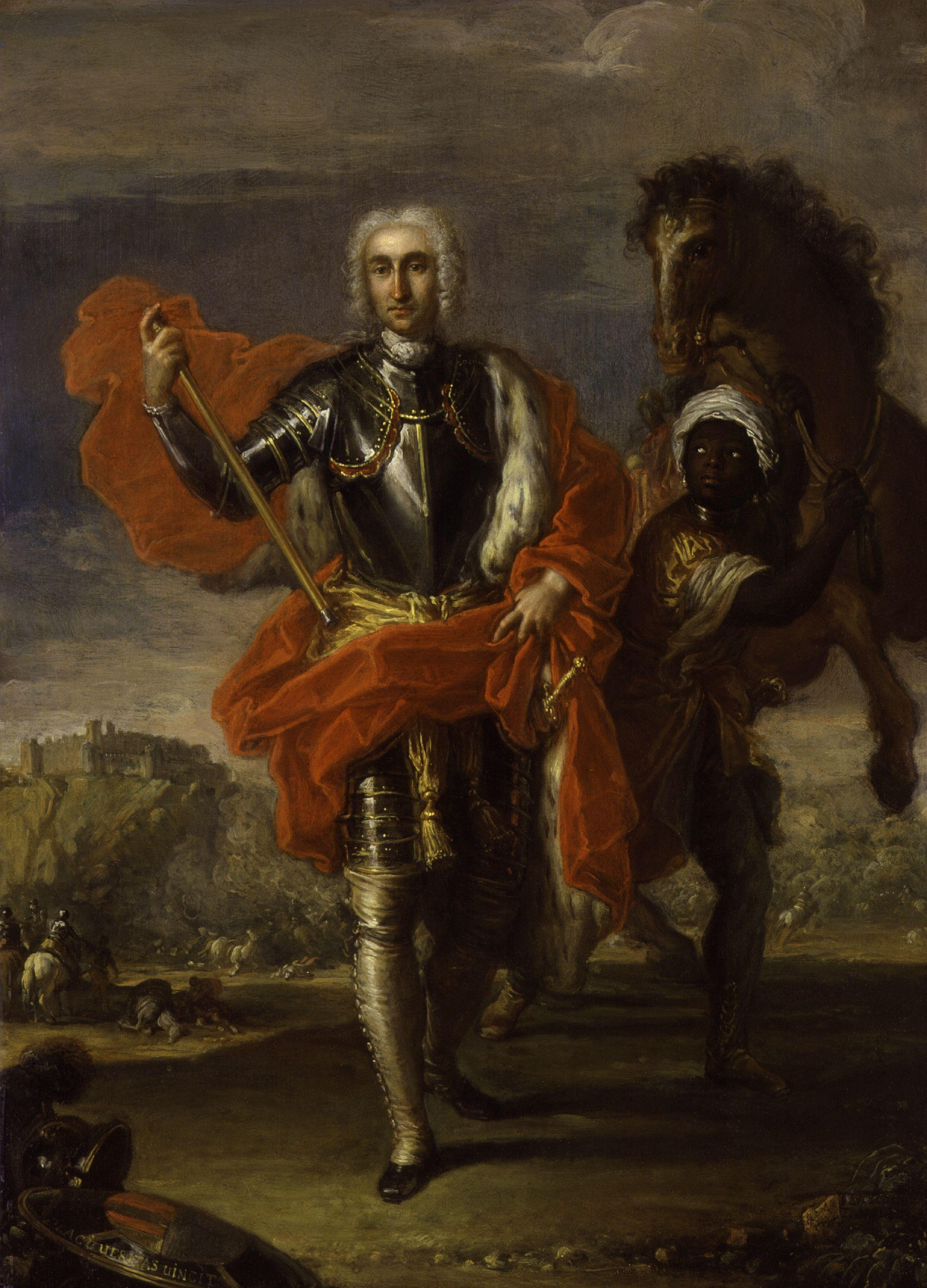
- Portrait by Placido Costanzi, c. 1733
- Born: 1692/1693; Inverugie Castle, Aberdeenshire
- Died: 1776 (aged 85–86); Potsdam, Prussia
- Military career
- Allegiance: Great Britain; Jacobites; Prussia
- Branch: British Army; Jacobite Army; Prussian Army
- Service years: 1708–1711 (Great Britain); 1719 (Jacobites)
- Rank: Colonel (Great Britain)
- Unit: 2nd Troop Horse Grenadier Guards
- Conflicts: War of the Spanish Succession; Jacobite rising of 1715; Battle of Sheriffmuir; Jacobite rising of 1719

George Keith, 10th Earl Marischal (1692/1693 – 1778) was a Scottish-born army officer and diplomat. After leading Jacobite forces in the failed Jacobite rising of 1719, he fled Britain and joined the Prussian Army. Becoming a close confidant of Frederick the Great, he served as the Prussian ambassador to Spain, France and Great Britain. Keith was the tenth and last Earl Marischal.

== Life ==
George Keith was born in either 1692 or 1693, probably at Inverugie Castle, Aberdeenshire. He was the son of William Keith, 9th Earl Marischal and Mary Drummond, daughter of James Drummond, 4th Earl of Perth. Keith was commissioned into the British Army and served in Flanders during the War of the Spanish Succession from 1708 to 1711, when he left the Army due to his support for placing James Francis Stuart on the British throne after Queen Anne's death. Keith inherited his father's title of Earl Marischal upon the latter's death in 1712. He fought on the Jacobite side during the Jacobite rising of 1715, including at the Battle of Sheriffmuir, and was subsequently attainted for treason by the British government, with his estates being seized by the Crown.

Keith fled to France and went on to serve the Jacobite court at Avignon, including as its ambassador to Spain. In 1719, he invaded Scotland at the head of a force of Jacobite exiles and Spanish marines in the Jacobite rising of 1719, but fled back to the Continent following his defeat at at Glen Shiel. On 29 December 1725, Keith was made a knight of the Order of the Thistle by Stuart. In March 1740, Stuart appointed him to be his commander-in-chief in Scotland, although the position was purely titular and had no practical role. Keith retired from the Jacobite court in 1741 as he found it unable to help the Jacobite cause; Keith warned Stuart not to trust positive reports from his agent in Paris, Francis Sempill.

Becoming increasingly isolated from the many Jacobite plots of the early 1740s, Keith was commissioned into the Prussian Army. In August 1751, Frederick the Great appointed Keith as the Prussian ambassador to France. As he had always been distrustful of Charles Edward Stuart, Keith refused to meet him in Paris during Stuart's secret visits, only engaging with his agent, Henry Goring. Following Stuart's dismissal of Goring in 1751, Keith broke off all communication with him. He subsequently served as the Prussian ambassador to Spain from 1759 to 1761, during which he informed Britain of Spanish preparations to enter the Seven Years' War on France's side, which led to him being pardoned by George II of Great Britain on 29 May 1759.

The British government proceeded to return Keith the right to use his title and regain his estates in Britain. Frederick appointed Keith as the Prussian ambassador to Britain in 1759, but despite brief visits to Scotland in 1761 and again from 1763 to 1764, he found the British climate and his neighbours unfavourable. At Frederick's invitation, Keith sold his British estates and returned to Prussia, becoming a close friend of Frederick, who awarded him the Order of the Black Eagle and appointed him Governor of Neuchâtel.

Keith died in Potsdam in 1778. Over the course of his life, Keith owned numerous enslaved domestic servants, all of whom worked in his household.

== Arms ==
Coat of arms of the Earl Marischal
Crest A Hart's Head erased proper armed with ten Tynes Or. Escutcheon Argent on a Chief Gules three Palets Or; behind the shield two Baton Gules semy of Thistles ensigned on the top with an Imperial Crown Or placed saltirewise being the insignia of the office of Great Marischal of Scotland. Supporters On either side a Hart proper attired as in the Crest. Motto Veritas Vincit (Truth conquers)

Military offices
Preceded by The Earl of Crawford	Captain and Colonel of the 2nd Troop Horse Grenadier Guards; 5 January 1714–1 June 1715	Succeeded by The Earl of Deloraine
Peerage of Scotland
Preceded by William Keith	Earl Marischal; 1712–1715	Forfeit
