= Eva Merthen =

Eva Merthen (1723 – 15 October 1811), known as "The Duchess of Finland", was a Finnish woman known for her relationship with the General James Keith during the Russian occupation of the Swedish province of Finland during the Russo-Swedish War (1741–1743). She is the subject of the novel "Hertiginnan av Finland" (1850) by Zacharias Topelius.

== Life ==
Merthen was the daughter of the mayor of Åbo (Turku), Karl Merthen. She made the acquaintance of Keith, who was the leader of the Russian forces who captured Åbo in 1742, at the receptions arranged by the Russian officers and where she made a success as a well-educated, charming beauty. During the occupation, Keith was given authority to manage the occupation as he wished, and Merthen is considered to have influenced his rule and by her influence making the policy toward civilians mild during the Russian occupation.

Her father died shortly before the peace in 1743, and when Keith left Finland, she followed him. They were never technically married, but she was treated by Keith as well as by society as his official and legal spouse, especially after he joined Prussian service. After the death of Keith in 1758, she married in 1760 to the politician Johann David von Reichenbach (1732–1807) in Stralsund.
