= Karl Ferdinand von Hagen =

Karl Ferdinand von Hagen, once called Geist
- Born: 1711
- Died: 19 February 1759 (aged 47–48); Bautzen
- Military career
- Allegiance: Prussia
- Branch: Prussian Army
- Service years: 1740–1759
- Rank: Major General
- Conflicts: First Silesian War; Second Silesian War; Seven Years' War

Karl Ferdinand von Hagen (born 1711; died 19 February 1759 in Bautzen), also called Karl Ferdinand von Geist, was a Prussian major general and chief of Infantry Regiment No. 8. He died from injuries received at the Battle of Hochkirch.

== Family ==
Hagen's family came from the Mansfeld branch of the Hagen noble family. His father was chamberlain for the Polish King Stanisław Leszczyński. Karl Ferdinand von Hagen was married to a woman from the Behr family; she predeceased him (breast cancer) in Potsdam in January 1756, and he left no heirs.

== Military service ==
As a young man, he joined the life regiment of King Frederick William I. On 4 August 1740 he became second lieutenant and joined the first battalion of the life regiment of the new king Frederick II. There he received the rank of a captain. On 18 June 1745, he became Chief of Staff of the Guard, with the rank of lieutenant colonel. In the First Silesian War, he led his own grenadier battalion composed of companies from Regiments No. 5 Wedel and No. 20 (Voigt). Hagen received command of a grenadier battalion in the Second Silesian War, this time from companies of Regiments No. 13 Truchsess and No. 37 (Moulin).

On 27 October 1745, he took over the company of Lieutenant-Colonel von Wedel, who had fallen in the Battle of Soor. In July 1755 he was promoted to colonel and at the same time became captain of the guard. He was promoted to the major of the guard in August 1756, and became commander of the second and third battalions of the guard. On 3 January 1757 he was appointed major general. After the Battle of Prague in 1757, he commanded Infantry Regiment No. 8. He was badly injured in the debacle at Hochkirch, when Frederick tried to retake the village. He was carried with the army to Bautzen, where he died on 19 February 1759.
