= James Drummond, 4th Earl of Perth =

Scottish politician

The Right Honourable The Earl of Perth KT PC
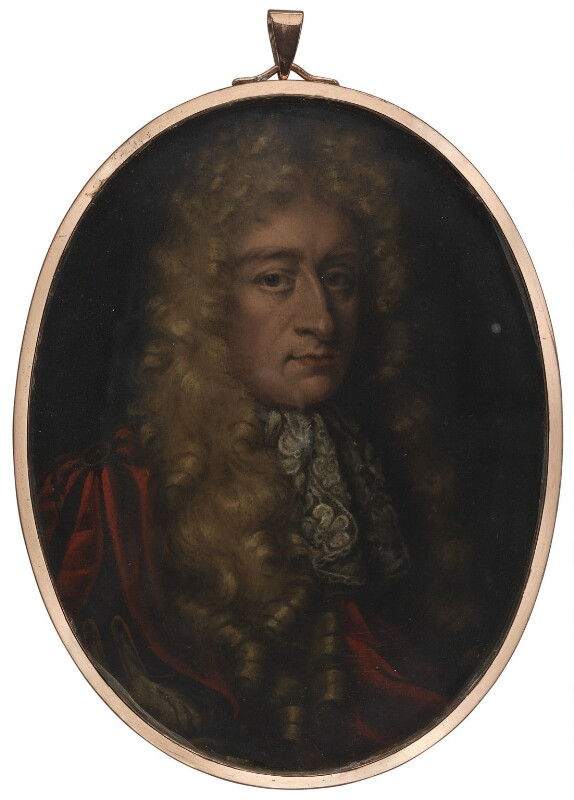

Lord Chancellor of Scotland
- In office 1684–1688
- Monarch: James VII
- Preceded by: The Earl of Aberdeen
- Succeeded by: The Earl of Tweeddale

Personal details
- Born: 7 July 1648 Kingdom of Scotland
- Died: 11 May 1716 (aged 68) St Germain, Kingdom of France
- Spouse(s): Lady Jane Douglas; Lilias Drummond; Lady Mary Gordon
- Children: James Drummond, 2nd Duke of Perth; Mary Drummond
- Parent(s): James Drummond, 3rd Earl of Perth; Lady Anne Gordon
- Education: University of St Andrews

Military service
- Allegiance: House of Stuart
- Battles/wars: Glorious Revolution

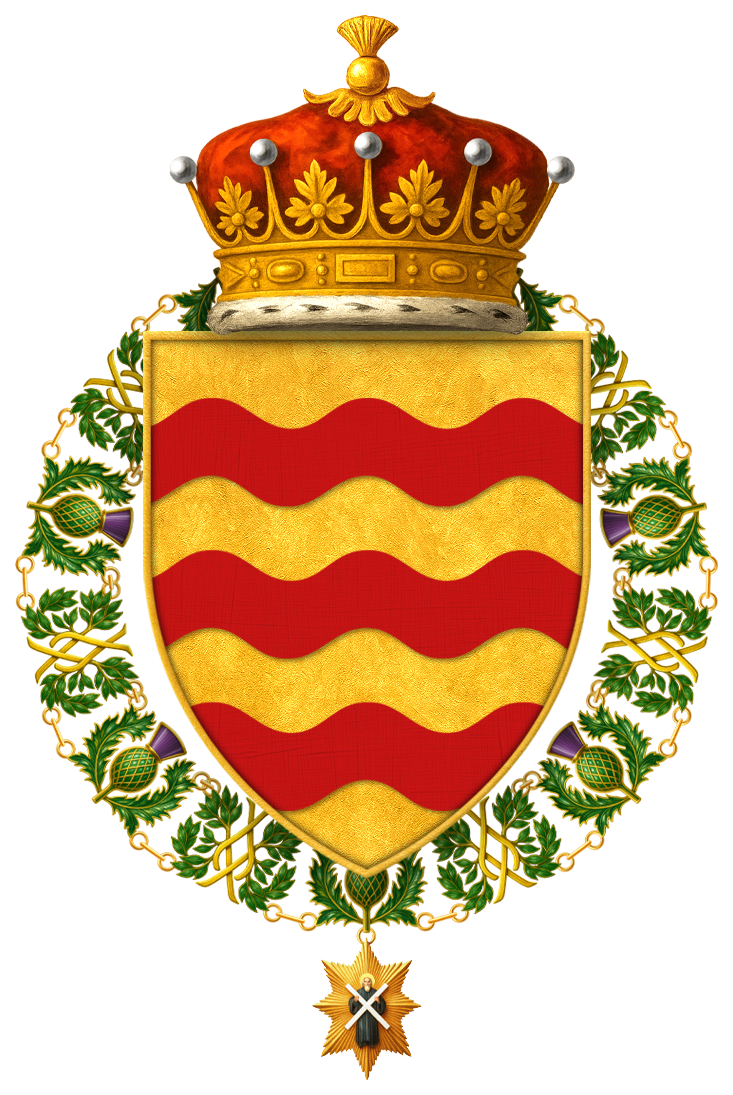
Shield of Arms of James Drummond, 4th Earl of Perth, KT, PC

James Drummond, 4th Earl of Perth, KT, PC (1648 – 11 May 1716) was a Scottish politician.

== Family ==
The eldest son of James Drummond, 3rd Earl of Perth by his spouse Lady Anne, daughter of George Gordon, 2nd Marquess of Huntly, he was educated at the University of St Andrews, and succeeded his father on 2 June 1675, and was served heir to him on 1 October.

== Political career ==
In 1678 he was appointed a member of the Scottish Privy Council and supported Lord Lauderdale's policy of giving up the disaffected western shires of Scotland to highland raids, before joining Hamilton's faction in opposition to Lauderdale. After Lauderdale's retirement in 1680 he was one of the Committee of Seven which managed Scottish affairs. He was appointed Lord Justice General in 1682 and an Extraordinary Lord of Session on 16 November the same year. He introduced the use of the thumbscrew in Scotland. He was also Lord Chancellor of Scotland, 1684–1688.

== New Jersey ==
Drummond was a partner with William Penn in the settlement of East New Jersey in 1681. As one of 24 proprietors of a large parcel of property that took up much of what is now the State of New Jersey, Perth sponsored an expedition in 1684 to establish a settlement there. The City of Perth Amboy, New Jersey, which sits on the waterfront facing Staten Island, New York, and which was once a port city in its own right, is named in his honor – a statue of Lord Perth stands in front of City Hall ("Amboy" comes from a Lenape word meaning "the point").

== Roman Catholicism ==
In 1685 the 4th Earl of Perth converted to Roman Catholicism, along with his brother, the 1st Earl of Melfort, which brought him into high favour with King James VII and II. In 1686, Perth and his brother opened a Catholic chapel in Edinburgh, and their public attendance there resulted in a riot. Perth and his brother suggested to James II that the Scottish Parliament would approve a repeal of the Test Act and penal laws against Catholics and Protestant dissenters, but this was later proved untrue. On 29 May 1687, nonetheless, he was made a Knight of the Thistle, being one of the eight original knights of that Order.

He is said to have had a novodamus, 17 December 1687, (on resignation) of his dignities, creating him Earl of Perth, Lord Drummond, Stobhall, and Montefex (Scotland), with remainder, failing heirs-male of his and of his brother's body, to the heirs-male of the second Earl. The records of Perth council refer to Catholic worship at Stobhall in the 1680s, and in 1700 Drummond Castle became a centre of Catholic worship in Perthshire.

When James retreated from Salisbury before William of Orange, the people of Edinburgh, in the absence of the troops whom Perth had disbanded, rose against him. Perth departed on 8 December under a strong escort to his seat of Drummond Castle, Perthshire. Finding himself unsafe there, he fled in disguise over the Ochil Hills to Burntisland, where he gained a vessel about to sail to France. He had, however, been recognised, and a boatful of watermen from Kirkcaldy pursued the vessel, which, as it was almost a dead calm, was overtaken at the mouth of the Forth. Perth was dragged from the hold in woman's clothes, stripped of all he had, and thrown into the common prison of Kirkcaldy. Thence he was taken to Stirling Castle, and not released until 4 August 1693 on condition of a bond to leave the kingdom under penalty of £5000.

== St. Germain ==
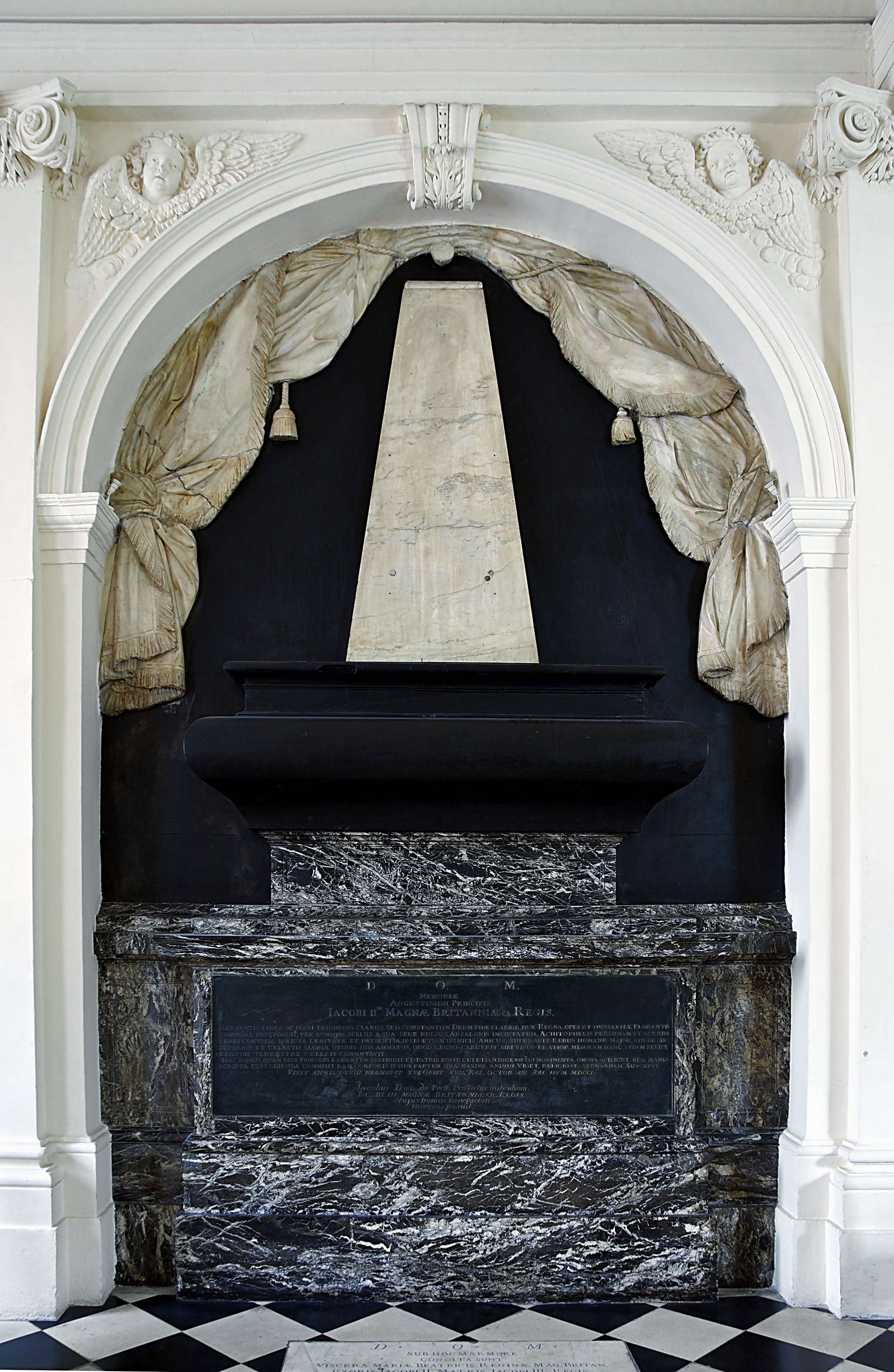
Monument for the brain of King James II & VII in Paris

He joined the exiled King at St Germain, by whom he was, on 19 August 1696, appointed Governor to the young Prince of Wales, and by whose testamentary directions he was, before 17 October 1701, created by King James III and VIII, Duke of Perth, Marquess of Drummond, Earl of Stobhall, Viscount Cargill, and Baron Concraig, all proclaimed as in the Peerage of Scotland (but in reality in the Jacobite peerage), with remainder to his heirs-male whatsoever. In 1701 he was recognised as a Duke in France by King Louis XIV.

On 14 February 1703, he was made a Gentleman of the Bedchamber, and on 21 June 1706 he was appointed a Knight of the Garter. He was afterwards Chamberlain to Queen Mary of Modena, and is said to have been created a Knight of the Golden Fleece by the King of Spain.

During James's exile, the Duke of Perth acted as his ambassador to Rome, and after the King's death, Perth erected a monument to him in Paris.

== Marriage and death ==
The Duke of Perth married:

- Firstly, 18 January 1670, Lady Jane, daughter of William Douglas, 1st Marquess of Douglas by his second wife Lady Mary, daughter of George Gordon, 1st Marquess of Huntly. Their daughter, Lady Mary Drummond, married William Keith, 9th Earl Marischal
- Secondly, Lilias (died c. 1685), Dowager Countess of Tullibardine and daughter of Sir James Drummond of Machany
- Thirdly, Lady Mary (1646–1726), daughter of Lewis Gordon, 3rd Marquess of Huntly by his spouse Mary, daughter of Sir John Grant of Freuchie. Lady Mary had been a Lady of the Bedchamber in Ordinary to Queen Mary of Modena. Her heart was buried with her husband.

He died at St Germain, was interred in the Scots Chapel, Paris, and was succeeded by his son and heir by his first wife:

- James Drummond, 2nd Duke of Perth (c. 1674–1720).

== Notes ==
Political offices
Preceded by 1st Earl of Aberdeen	Lord Chancellor of Scotland; 1684–1689	Succeeded by 1st Marquess of Tweeddale
Peerage of Scotland
Preceded by James Drummond	Earl of Perth, Lord Drummond; 1675–1716	Forfeit (restored in 1853 for George Drummond)
Loss of title	— TITULAR — Earl of Perth, Lord Drummond; Jacobite Peerage; 1716	Succeeded by James Drummond
New creation	— TITULAR — Duke of Perth, Marquess of Drummond, Earl of Stobhall, Viscount Cargill & Baron Concraig; Jacobite Peerage; 1701–1716	Succeeded by James Drummond
