= August 30 =

August 30 this year in various calendars
- Sunday, 30 August 2026
Akan	Kurukwasi
Armenian	11 Hoṙi 1476
Aztec	Atemoztli 12, 12 Xōchitl
Babylonian	16 Abu, 2337 SE
Balinese pawukon	Luang, Pepet, Pasah, Laba, Wage, Paniron, Redite of Uye, Indra, Dangu, Raksasa
Bengali	15 Bhadro, BS 1433
Chinese	Yang Fire Rat・Emptiness Mansion; Fire Horse Year, Month 7, Day 18 (Chushu, 8 days until Bailu)
Common Era	30 August 2026 CE
Coptic	24 Mesori, AM 1742
Egyptian	16 Tybi, 2775 NE
Ethiopian	24 Naḥasē, 2018 Amätä Məhrät
French Republican	Décade II, Tridi de Fructidor de l'Année 234 de la République
Gregorian	30 August, AD 2026
Hebrew	17 Elul, AM 5786
Hindu	Uttarabhādrapada・Dhṛti; Solar: 14 Bhādrapada, 1948 SE; Lunisolar: Dvitīyā, Kṛishna pakṣa of Śrāvaṇa, 2083 VE; Rāudra・5127 KY・1,872,817
Icelandic	Sunnudagur, 6 Tvímánuður 2026
Islamic	16 Rabi' al-awwal, AH 1448 (using tabular method)
ISO week date	2026-W35-7
Japanese	18 Fumizuki, Reiwa 8 (Shosho, 8 days until Hakuro)
Julian	17 August, AD 2026 (AM 7534)
Julian day	2461283
Korean	18 Wonsungidal, 4359 DE
Maya	13.0.13.16.0; 13 Mol, 12 Ahau
Roman	ante diem XVI Kalendas Septembres, MMDCCLXXIX AUC
Solar Hijri	8 Shahrivar, SH 1405
Tibetan	17 gro bzhin, me pho rta 2153 or 1772 or 1000

<<	August					>>
Su	Mo	Tu	We	Th	Fr	Sa
						1
2	3	4	5	6	7	8
9	10	11	12	13	14	15
16	17	18	19	20	21	22
23	24	25	26	27	28	29
30	31
2026

August 30 in recent years
2026 (Sunday)
2025 (Saturday)
2024 (Friday)
2023 (Wednesday)
2022 (Tuesday)
2021 (Monday)
2020 (Sunday)
2019 (Friday)
2018 (Thursday)
2017 (Wednesday)

August 30 is the 242nd day of the year (243rd in leap years) in the Gregorian calendar; 123 days remain until the end of the year.

== Events ==
=== Pre-1600 ===
- 70 – Titus ends the siege of Jerusalem after destroying Herod's Temple.
- 1057 – Elderly Byzantine Emperor Michael VI Bringas abdicates after just one year on the throne.
- 1060 – The Mirdasids defeat the Fatimid Caliphate at the Battle of al-Funaydiq, signalling the definitive loss of Aleppo for the Fatimids.
- 1282 – Peter III of Aragon lands at Trapani to intervene in the War of the Sicilian Vespers.
- 1363 – The five-week Battle of Lake Poyang begins, in which the forces of two Chinese rebel leaders (Chen Youliang and Zhu Yuanzhang) meet to decide who will supplant the Yuan dynasty.
- 1464 – Paul II succeeds Pius II as pope of the Catholic Church.
- 1535 – With the papal bull Eius qui immobilis, Pope Paul III excommunicates King Henry VIII of England from the Catholic Church for approving the Acts of Supremacy, although the bull is likely never published.
- 1574 – Guru Ram Das becomes the Fourth Sikh Guru/Master.
- 1590 – Tokugawa Ieyasu enters Edo Castle. (Traditional Japanese date: August 1, 1590)
- 1594 – King James VI of Scotland holds a masque at the baptism of Prince Henry at Stirling Castle.

=== 1601–1900 ===
- 1721 – The Great Northern War between Sweden and Russia ends in the Treaty of Nystad.
- 1727 – Anne, eldest daughter of King George II of Great Britain, is given the title Princess Royal.
- 1757 – Battle of Gross-Jägersdorf: Russian force under Field Marshal Stepan Fyodorovich Apraksin beats a smaller Prussian force commanded by Field Marshal Hans von Lehwaldt, during the Seven Years' War.
- 1791 – HMS Pandora sinks after having run aground on the outer Great Barrier Reef the previous day.
- 1799 – The entire Dutch fleet is captured by British forces under the command of Sir Ralph Abercromby and Admiral Sir Charles Mitchell during the War of the Second Coalition.
- 1800 – Gabriel Prosser postpones a planned slave rebellion in Richmond, Virginia, but is arrested before he can make it happen.
- 1808 – The convention of Cintra allows the defeated French troops to be transported out of Iberia on British ships, including their loot.
- 1813 – First Battle of Kulm: French forces are defeated by an Austrian-Prussian-Russian alliance.
- 1813 – Creek War: Fort Mims massacre: Creek "Red Sticks" kill over 500 settlers (including over 250 armed militia) in Fort Mims, north of Mobile, Alabama.
- 1835 – Australia: Melbourne, Victoria is founded.
- 1836 – The city of Houston is founded by Augustus Chapman Allen and John Kirby Allen.
- 1862 – American Civil War: Battle of Richmond: Confederates under Edmund Kirby Smith rout Union forces under General William "Bull" Nelson.
- 1873 – Austrian explorers Julius von Payer and Karl Weyprecht discover the archipelago of Franz Josef Land in the Arctic Sea.
- 1896 – Philippine Revolution: After Spanish victory in the Battle of San Juan del Monte, eight provinces in the Philippines are declared under martial law by the Spanish Governor-General Ramón Blanco y Erenas.

=== 1901–present ===
- 1909 – Burgess Shale fossils are discovered by Charles Doolittle Walcott.
- 1914 – World War I: Germans defeat the Russians in the Battle of Tannenberg.
- 1916 – Ernest Shackleton completes the rescue of all of his men stranded on Elephant Island in Antarctica.
- 1917 – Vietnamese prison guards led by Trịnh Văn Cấn mutiny at the Thái Nguyên penitentiary against local French authority.
- 1918 – Fanni Kaplan shoots and seriously injures Bolshevik leader Vladimir Lenin, which, along with the assassination of Bolshevik senior official Moisei Uritsky days earlier, prompts the decree for Red Terror.
- 1922 – Battle of Dumlupınar: The final battle in the Greco-Turkish War (Turkish War of Independence).
- 1936 – The RMS Queen Mary wins the Blue Riband by setting the fastest transatlantic crossing.
- 1940 – The Second Vienna Award reassigns the territory of Northern Transylvania from Romania to Hungary.
- 1941 – The Tighina Agreement, a treaty regarding administration issues of the Transnistria Governorate, is signed between Germany and Romania.
- 1942 – World War II: The Battle of Alam el Halfa begins.
- 1945 – The Japanese occupation of Hong Kong comes to an end.
- 1945 – The Supreme Commander of the Allied Forces, General Douglas MacArthur, lands at Atsugi Air Force Base.
- 1945 – The Allied Control Council, governing Germany after World War II, comes into being.
- 1959 – South Vietnamese opposition figure Phan Quang Dan is elected to the National Assembly despite soldiers being bussed in to vote for President Ngo Dinh Diem's candidate.
- 1962 – Japan conducts a test of the NAMC YS-11, its first aircraft since World War II and its only successful commercial aircraft from before or after the war.
- 1963 – The Moscow–Washington hotline between the leaders of the U.S. and the Soviet Union goes into operation.
- 1967 – Thurgood Marshall is confirmed as the first African American Justice of the Supreme Court of the United States.
- 1974 – A Belgrade–Dortmund express train derails at the main train station in Zagreb killing 153 passengers.
- 1974 – A powerful bomb explodes at the Mitsubishi Heavy Industries headquarters in Marunouchi, Tokyo. Eight are killed, 378 are injured. Eight left-wing activists are arrested on May 19, 1975, by Japanese authorities.
- 1974 – The Third World Population Conference ends in Bucharest, Romania. At the end of the ceremony, the UN-Romanian Demographic Centre is inaugurated.
- 1981 – President Mohammad-Ali Rajai and Prime Minister Mohammad-Javad Bahonar of Iran are assassinated in a bombing. The office of Iran's Prosecutor General blames the People's Mujahedin of Iran.
- 1983 – Aeroflot Flight 5463 crashes into Dolan Mountain while approaching Almaty International Airport in present-day Kazakhstan, killing all 90 people on board.
- 1983 – STS-8: The Space Shuttle Challenger takes off on the first night launch of the shuttle program. Guion Bluford becomes the first African-American in space on this mission.
- 1984 – STS-41-D: The Space Shuttle Discovery takes off on its maiden voyage.
- 1991 – Dissolution of the Soviet Union: Azerbaijan declares independence from Soviet Union.
- 1992 – The 11-day Ruby Ridge standoff ends with Randy Weaver surrendering to federal authorities.
- 1995 – Bosnian War: NATO launches Operation Deliberate Force against Bosnian Serb forces.
- 1998 – Second Congo War: Armed forces of the Democratic Republic of the Congo (DRC) and their Angolan and Zimbabwean allies recapture Matadi and the Inga dams in the western DRC from RCD and Rwandan troops.
- 2002 – Rico Linhas Aéreas Flight 4823 crashes on approach to Rio Branco International Airport, killing 23 of the 31 people on board.
- 2008 – A Conviasa Boeing 737 crashes into Illiniza Volcano in Ecuador, killing all three people on board.
- 2014 – Prime Minister of Lesotho Tom Thabane flees to South Africa as the army allegedly stages a coup.
- 2021 – The last remaining American troops leave Afghanistan, ending U.S. involvement in the war.
- 2023 – Gabonese coup d'état: After Ali Bongo Ondimba's reelection, a military coup ousts him, ending 56 years of Bongo family rule in Gabon.

== Births ==
=== Pre-1600 ===
- 1334 – Peter of Castile (died 1369)
- 1574 – Albert Szenczi Molnár, Hungarian writer and translator (died 1634)

=== 1601–1900 ===
- 1609 – Sir Alexander Carew, 2nd Baronet, English politician (died 1644)
- 1609 – Artus Quellinus the Elder, Flemish sculptor (died 1668)
- 1627 – Itō Jinsai, Japanese philosopher (died 1705)
- 1716 – Capability Brown, English landscape architect (died 1783)
- 1720 – Samuel Whitbread, English brewer and politician, founded Whitbread (died 1796)
- 1748 – Jacques-Louis David, French painter and illustrator (died 1825)
- 1768 – Joseph Dennie, American author and journalist (died 1812)
- 1797 – Mary Shelley, English novelist and playwright (died 1851)
- 1812 – Agoston Haraszthy, Hungarian-American businessman, founded Buena Vista Winery (died 1869)
- 1818 – Alexander H. Rice, American businessman and politician, 30th Governor of Massachusetts (died 1895)
- 1820 – George Frederick Root, American songwriter (Battle Cry of Freedom) (died 1895)
- 1822 – Adolph Strauch, Prussian American landscape architect (died 1883)
- 1839 – Gulstan Ropert, French-American bishop and missionary (died 1903)
- 1842 – Grand Duchess Alexandra Alexandrovna of Russia (died 1849)
- 1844 – Emily Ruete/Salama bint Said, also called Sayyida Salme, a Princess of Zanzibar and Oman (died 1924)
- 1848 – Andrew Onderdonk, American surveyor and contractor (died 1905)
- 1850 – Marcelo H. del Pilar, Filipino journalist and lawyer (died 1896)
- 1852 – Jacobus Henricus van 't Hoff, Dutch chemist and academic, Nobel Prize laureate (died 1911)
- 1852 – J. Alden Weir, American painter and academic (died 1919)
- 1855 – Evelyn De Morgan, English painter (died 1919)
- 1856 – Carl David Tolmé Runge, German mathematician, physicist, and spectroscopist (died 1927)
- 1858 – Ignaz Sowinski, Galician architect (died 1917)
- 1860 – Isaac Levitan, Russian painter and illustrator (died 1900)
- 1870 – Grand Duchess Alexandra Georgievna of Russia (died 1891)
- 1871 – Ernest Rutherford, New Zealand-English physicist and chemist, Nobel Prize laureate (died 1937)
- 1883 – Theo van Doesburg, Dutch artist (died 1931)
- 1884 – Theodor Svedberg, Swedish chemist and physicist, Nobel Prize laureate (died 1971)
- 1885 – Tedda Courtney, Australian rugby league player and coach (died 1957)
- 1887 – Paul Kochanski, Polish violinist and composer (died 1934)
- 1890 – Samuel Frederick Henry Thompson, English captain and pilot (died 1918)
- 1893 – Huey Long, American lawyer and politician, 40th Governor of Louisiana (died 1935)
- 1896 – Raymond Massey, Canadian-American actor and playwright (died 1983)
- 1898 – Shirley Booth, American actress and singer (died 1992)

=== 1901–present ===
- 1901 – John Gunther, American journalist and author (died 1970)
- 1901 – Roy Wilkins, American journalist and activist (died 1981)
- 1903 – Bhagwati Charan Verma, Indian author (died 1981)
- 1906 – Joan Blondell, American actress and singer (died 1979)
- 1906 – Olga Taussky-Todd, Austrian mathematician (died 1995)
- 1907 – Leonor Fini, Argentine painter, illustrator, and author (died 1996)
- 1907 – Bertha Parker Pallan, American archaeologist (died 1978)
- 1907 – John Mauchly, American physicist and co-founder of the first computer company (died 1980)
- 1908 – Fred MacMurray, American actor (died 1991)
- 1909 – Virginia Lee Burton, American author and illustrator (died 1968)
- 1910 – Roger Bushell, South African-English soldier and pilot (died 1944)
- 1912 – Edward Mills Purcell, American physicist, Nobel Prize laureate (died 1997)
- 1912 – Nancy Wake, New Zealand-English captain (died 2011)
- 1913 – Richard Stone, English economist and statistician, Nobel Prize laureate (died 1991)
- 1915 – Princess Lilian, Duchess of Halland (died 2013)
- 1915 – Robert Strassburg, American composer, conductor, and educator (died 2003)
- 1916 – Shailendra, Pakistani-Indian songwriter (died 1968)
- 1917 – Dan Enright, American television producer (died 1992)
- 1917 – Denis Healey, English soldier and politician, Chancellor of the Exchequer (died 2015)
- 1917 – Grand Duke Vladimir Kirillovich of Russia (died 1992)
- 1918 – Harold Atcherley, English businessman (died 2017)
- 1918 – Billy Johnson, American baseball player (died 2006)
- 1918 – Ted Williams, American baseball player and manager (died 2002)
- 1919 – Maurice Hilleman, American microbiologist and vaccinologist (died 2005)
- 1919 – Wolfgang Wagner, German director and manager (died 2010)
- 1919 – Kitty Wells, American singer-songwriter and guitarist (died 2012)
- 1920 – Arnold Green, Estonian soldier and politician (died 2011)
- 1922 – Lionel Murphy, Australian jurist and politician, 22nd Attorney-General of Australia (died 1986)
- 1922 – Regina Resnik, American soprano and actress (died 2013)
- 1923 – Barbara Ansell, English physician and author (died 2001)
- 1923 – Charmian Clift, Australian journalist and author (died 1969)
- 1923 – Vic Seixas, American tennis player (died 2024)
- 1924 – Kenny Dorham, American singer-songwriter and trumpet player (died 1972)
- 1924 – Lajos Kisfaludy, Hungarian chemist and engineer (died 1988)
- 1924 – Geoffrey Beene, American fashion designer (died 2004)
- 1925 – Laurent de Brunhoff, French author and illustrator (died 2024)
- 1925 – Donald Symington, American actor (died 2013)
- 1926 – Daryl Gates, American police officer, created the D.A.R.E. Program (died 2010)
- 1927 – Bill Daily, American actor and comedian (died 2018)
- 1927 – Piet Kee, Dutch organist and composer (died 2018)
- 1928 – Lloyd Casner, American race car driver (died 1965)
- 1928 – Harvey Hart, Canadian director and producer (died 1989)
- 1928 – Johnny Mann, American singer-songwriter and conductor (died 2014)
- 1929 – Guy de Lussigny, French painter and sculptor (died 2001)
- 1929 – Ian McNaught-Davis, English mountaineer and television host (died 2014)
- 1930 – Warren Buffett, American businessman and philanthropist
- 1930 – Noel Harford, New Zealand cricketer and basketball player (died 1981)
- 1931 – Jack Swigert, American pilot and astronaut (died 1982)
- 1933 – Don Getty, Canadian football player and politician, 11th Premier of Alberta (died 2016)
- 1934 – Antonio Cabangon Chua, Filipino media mogul and businessman (died 2016)
- 1935 – Sylvia Earle, American marine biologist
- 1935 – John Phillips, American singer-songwriter and guitarist (died 2001)
- 1935 – Alexandra Bellow, Romanian-American mathematician (died 2025)
- 1936 – Peter North, English scholar and academic
- 1937 – Bruce McLaren, New Zealand race car driver and engineer, founded the McLaren racing team (died 1970)
- 1938 – Murray Gleeson, Australian lawyer and judge, 11th Chief Justice of Australia
- 1939 – Elizabeth Ashley, American actress
- 1939 – John Peel, English radio host and producer (died 2004)
- 1940 – Jack Biondolillo, American bowler (died 2021)
- 1941 – Ignazio Giunti, Italian race car driver (died 1971)
- 1941 – Ben Jones, American actor and politician (died 2026)
- 1941 – Sue MacGregor, English journalist and radio host
- 1941 – John McNally, English singer and guitarist
- 1942 – Jonathan Aitken, Irish-British journalist and politician, Minister for Defence Procurement
- 1942 – John Kani, South African actor
- 1942 – Pervez Sajjad, Pakistani cricketer
- 1943 – Tal Brody, American-Israeli basketball player and coach
- 1943 – Robert Crumb, American illustrator
- 1943 – Colin Dann, English author
- 1943 – Nigel Hall, English sculptor and academic
- 1943 – Jean-Claude Killy, French skier
- 1943 – David Maslanka, American composer and academic (died 2017)
- 1944 – Frances Cairncross, English economist, journalist, and academic
- 1944 – Freek de Jonge, Dutch singer and comedian
- 1944 – Molly Ivins, American journalist and author (died 2007)
- 1944 – Tug McGraw, American baseball player (died 2004)
- 1944 – Alex Wyllie, New Zealand rugby player and coach (died 2025)
- 1945 – Fred Tackett, American songwriter and multi-instrumentalist (Little Feat, 1988–2012)
- 1946 – Queen Anne-Marie of Greece
- 1946 – Peggy Lipton, American model and actress (died 2019)
- 1947 – Allan Rock, Canadian lawyer, politician, and diplomat, Canadian Ambassador to the United Nations
- 1948 – Lewis Black, American comedian, actor, and author
- 1948 – Fred Hampton, American activist and revolutionary, chairman of the Illinois chapter of the Black Panther Party (died 1969)
- 1948 – Victor Skumin, Russian psychiatrist, psychologist, and academic
- 1949 – Ted Ammon, American financier and banker (died 2001)
- 1949 – Don Boudria, Canadian public servant and politician, 2nd Canadian Minister for International Cooperation
- 1950 – Antony Gormley, English sculptor and academic
- 1950 – Dana Rosemary Scallon, Irish singer and activist
- 1951 – Timothy Bottoms, American actor
- 1951 – Gediminas Kirkilas, Lithuanian politician, 11th Prime Minister of Lithuania (died 2024)
- 1951 – Jim Paredes, Filipino singer-songwriter and actor
- 1952 – Simon Bainbridge, English composer and educator (died 2021)
- 1952 – Wojtek Fibak, Polish tennis player
- 1953 – Ron George, American businessman and politician
- 1953 – Lech Majewski, Polish director, producer, and screenwriter
- 1953 – Horace Panter, English bass player
- 1953 – Robert Parish, American basketball player
- 1954 – Alexander Lukashenko, Belarusian marshal and politician, 1st President of Belarus
- 1954 – Ravi Shankar Prasad, Indian lawyer and politician, Indian Minister of Communications and IT
- 1954 – David Paymer, American actor and director
- 1955 – Jamie Moses, English-American guitarist
- 1955 – Martin Jackson, English drummer
- 1956 – Frank Conniff, American actor, producer, and screenwriter
- 1957 – Gerald Albright, American musician
- 1958 – Karen Buck, Northern Irish politician
- 1958 – Fran Fraschilla, American basketball player, coach, and sportscaster
- 1958 – Muriel Gray, Scottish journalist and author
- 1958 – Anna Politkovskaya, Russian journalist and activist (died 2006)
- 1958 – Peter Tunks, Australian rugby league player and sportscaster
- 1959 – Mark "Jacko" Jackson, Australian footballer, actor, and singer
- 1960 – Ben Bradshaw, English journalist and politician, Secretary of State for Culture, Media and Sport
- 1960 – Gary Gordon, American sergeant, Medal of Honor recipient (died 1993)
- 1960 – Guy A. Lepage, Canadian comedian and producer
- 1962 – Ricky Sanders, American football player
- 1962 – Craig Whittaker, English businessman and politician
- 1963 – Dave Brockie, Canadian-American singer-songwriter and bass player (died 2014)
- 1963 – Michael Chiklis, American actor, director, and producer
- 1963 – Sabine Oberhauser, Austrian physician and politician (died 2017)
- 1963 – Phil Mills, Welsh race car driver
- 1964 – Gavin Fisher, English engineer and designer
- 1964 – Ra Luhse, Estonian architect
- 1966 – Peter Cunnah, Northern Irish singer-songwriter and producer
- 1966 – Joann Fletcher, English historian and academic
- 1966 – Michael Michele, American actress
- 1967 – Frederique van der Wal, Dutch model and actress
- 1967 – Justin Vaughan, New Zealand cricketer
- 1968 – Diran Adebayo, English author and critic
- 1968 – Vladimir Malakhov, Russian ice hockey player
- 1969 – Vladimir Jugović, Serbian footballer
- 1969 – Dimitris Sgouros, Greek pianist and composer
- 1970 – Carlo Checchinato, Italian rugby player and manager
- 1970 – Paulo Sousa, Portuguese footballer and manager
- 1970 – Michael Wong, Malaysian-Chinese singer-songwriter
- 1971 – Lars Frederiksen, American singer-songwriter and guitarist
- 1971 – Julian Smith, Scottish politician
- 1972 – Cameron Diaz, American model, actress, and producer
- 1972 – Pavel Nedvěd, Czech footballer
- 1972 – Hani Hanjour, Saudi terrorist, hijacker of American Airlines Flight 77 during the September 11 attacks (died 2001)
- 1973 – Lisa Ling, American journalist and author
- 1974 – Javier Otxoa, Spanish cyclist (died 2018)
- 1975 – Radhi Jaïdi, Tunisian footballer and coach
- 1976 – Mike Koplove, American baseball player
- 1977 – Shaun Alexander, American football player
- 1977 – Marlon Byrd, American baseball player
- 1977 – Raúl Castillo, American actor
- 1977 – Michael Gladis, American actor
- 1977 – Kamil Kosowski, Polish footballer
- 1977 – Félix Sánchez, American-Dominican runner and hurdler
- 1978 – Sinead Kerr, Scottish figure skater
- 1978 – Cliff Lee, American baseball player
- 1979 – Juan Ignacio Chela, Argentine tennis player
- 1979 – Leon Lopez, English singer-songwriter and actor
- 1979 – Scott Richmond, Canadian baseball player
- 1980 – Roberto Hernández, Dominican baseball player
- 1981 – Germán Legarreta, Puerto Rican-American actor
- 1981 – Adam Wainwright, American baseball player
- 1982 – Will Davison, Australian race car driver
- 1982 – Andy Roddick, American tennis player
- 1983 – Emmanuel Culio, Argentine footballer
- 1983 – Gustavo Eberto, Argentine footballer (died 2007)
- 1983 – Jun Matsumoto, Japanese singer, dancer, and actor
- 1983 – Simone Pepe, Italian footballer
- 1983 – Tian Qin, Chinese canoe racer
- 1983 – Marco Vianello, Italian footballer
- 1984 – Anthony Ireland, Zimbabwean cricketer
- 1984 – Joe Staley, American football player
- 1984 – Michael Grant Terry, American actor
- 1985 – Duane Brown, American football player
- 1985 – Richard Duffy, Welsh footballer
- 1985 – Joe Inoue, American singer-songwriter
- 1985 – Leisel Jones, Australian swimmer
- 1985 – Éva Risztov, Hungarian swimmer
- 1985 – Steven Smith, Scottish footballer
- 1985 – Eamon Sullivan, Australian swimmer
- 1985 – Anna Ushenina, Ukrainian chess player
- 1985 – Holly Weston, English actress
- 1986 – Theo Hutchcraft, English singer-songwriter
- 1986 – Lelia Masaga, New Zealand rugby player
- 1986 – Ryan Ross, American singer-songwriter and guitarist
- 1986 – Zafer Yelen, Turkish footballer
- 1987 – Johanna Braddy, American actress
- 1987 – Tania Foster, English singer-songwriter
- 1988 – Ernests Gulbis, Latvian tennis player
- 1989 – Simone Guerra, Italian footballer
- 1989 – Ronald Huth, Paraguayan footballer
- 1989 – Bebe Rexha, American singer-songwriter
- 1991 – Seriki Audu, Nigerian footballer (died 2014)
- 1991 – Jacqueline Cako, American tennis player
- 1991 – Liam Cooper, Scottish footballer
- 1992 – Jessica Henwick, British actress
- 1994 – Monika Povilaitytė, Lithuanian volleyball player
- 1994 – Heo Young-ji, South Korean singer
- 1994 – Kwon So-hyun, South Korean singer-songwriter and actress
- 1996 – Mikal Bridges, American basketball player
- 1996 – Trevor Jackson, American actor and singer-songwriter
- 2002 – Fábio Carvalho, Portuguese footballer
- 2002 – Drake Maye, American football player

== Deaths ==
=== Pre-1600 ===
- 526 – Theodoric the Great, Italian ruler (born 454)
- 832 – Cui Qun, Chinese chancellor (born 772)
- 1131 – Hervey le Breton, bishop of Bangor and Ely
- 1181 – Pope Alexander III (born c. 1100–1105)
- 1329 – Khutughtu Khan Kusala, Chinese emperor (born 1300)
- 1428 – Emperor Shōkō of Japan (born 1401)
- 1483 – Louis XI, King of France (born 1423)
- 1500 – Victor, Duke of Münsterberg and Opava, Count of Glatz (born 1443)
- 1580 – Emmanuel Philibert, Duke of Savoy (born 1528)

=== 1601–1900 ===
- 1604 – John Juvenal Ancina, Italian Oratorian and bishop (born 1545)
- 1619 – Shimazu Yoshihiro, Japanese samurai and warlord (born 1535)
- 1621 – Bahāʾ al-dīn al-ʿĀmilī, co-founder of Isfahan School of Islamic Philosophy (born 1547)
- 1751 – Christopher Polhem, Swedish physicist and engineer (born 1661)
- 1773 – Peshwa Narayan Rao, Prime Minister of Maratha Empire (born 1755, assassinated)
- 1856 – Gilbert Abbott à Beckett, English lawyer and author (born 1811)
- 1856 – Sir John Ross, Scottish naval officer and explorer (born 1777)
- 1879 – John Bell Hood, American/Confederate general (born 1831)
- 1886 – Ferris Jacobs, Jr., American general and politician (born 1836)
- 1896 – Aleksey Lobanov-Rostovsky, Russian politician and diplomat, Minister of Foreign Affairs for Russia (born 1824)

=== 1901–present ===
- 1906 – Hans Auer, Swiss-Austrian architect and educator, designed the Federal Palace of Switzerland (born 1847)
- 1907 – Richard Mansfield, American actor and manager (born 1857)
- 1908 – Alexander P. Stewart, American general (born 1821)
- 1928 – Wilhelm Wien, German physicist and academic, Nobel Prize laureate (born 1864)
- 1935 – Henri Barbusse, French journalist and author (born 1873)
- 1935 – Namık İsmail, Turkish painter and educator (born 1890)
- 1936 – Ronald Fellowes, 2nd Baron Ailwyn, English peer (born 1886)
- 1938 – Max Factor, Sr., Polish-born American make-up artist and businessman, founded the Max Factor Company (born 1877)
- 1940 – J. J. Thomson, English physicist and mathematician, Nobel Prize laureate (born 1856)
- 1941 – Peder Oluf Pedersen, Danish physicist and engineer (born 1874)
- 1943 – Eddy de Neve, Indonesian-Dutch footballer and lieutenant (born 1885)
- 1943 – Eustáquio van Lieshout, Dutch priest and missionary (born 1890)
- 1945 – Alfréd Schaffer, Hungarian footballer, coach, and manager (born 1893)
- 1946 – Konstantin Rodzaevsky, Russian lawyer (born 1907)
- 1947 – Gunnar Sommerfeldt, Danish actor and director (born 1890)
- 1948 – Alice Salomon, German-American social reformer (born 1872)
- 1949 – Arthur Fielder, English cricketer (born 1877)
- 1951 – Konstantin Märska, Estonian director and cinematographer (born 1896)
- 1954 – Alfredo Ildefonso Schuster, Italian cardinal (born 1880)
- 1961 – Cristóbal de Losada y Puga, Peruvian mathematician (born 1894)
- 1961 – Charles Coburn, American actor (born 1877)
- 1963 – Guy Burgess, English-Soviet spy (born 1911)
- 1964 – Salme Dutt, Estonian-English lawyer and politician (born 1888)
- 1967 – Ad Reinhardt, American painter, illustrator, and academic (born 1913)
- 1968 – William Talman, American actor and screenwriter (born 1915)
- 1970 – Del Moore, American comedian and actor (born 1916)
- 1970 – Abraham Zapruder, American clothing manufacturer, witness to the assassination of John F. Kennedy (born 1905)
- 1971 – Ali Hadi Bara, Iranian-Turkish sculptor (born 1906)
- 1979 – Jean Seberg, American actress (born 1938)
- 1981 – Vera-Ellen, American actress and dancer (born 1921)
- 1981 – Mohammad-Ali Rajai, Iranian politician, 2nd President of Iran (born 1933)
- 1985 – Taylor Caldwell, English-American author (born 1900)
- 1988 – Jack Marshall, New Zealand colonel, lawyer and politician, 28th Prime Minister of New Zealand (born 1912)
- 1989 – Seymour Krim, American journalist and critic (born 1922)
- 1990 – Bernard D. H. Tellegen, Dutch engineer and academic (born 1900)
- 1991 – Cyril Knowles, English footballer and manager (born 1944)
- 1991 – Vladimír Padrůněk, Czech bass player (born 1952)
- 1991 – Jean Tinguely, Swiss painter and sculptor (born 1925)
- 1993 – Richard Jordan, American actor (born 1938)
- 1994 – Lindsay Anderson, English director and screenwriter (born 1923)
- 1995 – Fischer Black, American economist and academic (born 1938)
- 1995 – Sterling Morrison, American guitarist and singer (born 1942)
- 1996 – Christine Pascal, French actress, director, and screenwriter (born 1953)
- 1999 – Reindert Brasser, Dutch discus thrower (born 1912)
- 1999 – Raymond Poïvet, French illustrator (born 1910)
- 2001 – Govan Mbeki, ANC activist and father of President of South Africa Thabo Mbeki (born 1910)
- 2002 – J. Lee Thompson, English-Canadian director, producer, and screenwriter (born 1914)
- 2003 – Charles Bronson, American actor and soldier (born 1921)
- 2003 – Donald Davidson, American philosopher and academic (born 1917)
- 2004 – Fred Lawrence Whipple, American astronomer and academic (born 1906)
- 2006 – Robin Cooke, Baron Cooke of Thorndon, New Zealand lawyer and judge (born 1926)
- 2006 – Glenn Ford, Canadian-American actor and producer (born 1916)
- 2006 – Naguib Mahfouz, Egyptian journalist and author, Nobel Prize laureate (born 1911)
- 2007 – Michael Jackson, English author and journalist (born 1942)
- 2007 – Charles Vanik, American soldier and politician (born 1918)
- 2008 – Brian Hambly, Australian rugby player and coach (born 1937)
- 2008 – Killer Kowalski, Canadian-American wrestler and trainer (born 1926)
- 2009 – Klaus-Peter Hanisch, German footballer (born 1952)
- 2010 – J. C. Bailey, American wrestler (born 1983)
- 2010 – Alain Corneau, French director and screenwriter (born 1943)
- 2010 – Myrtle Edwards, Australian cricketer and softball player (born 1921)
- 2010 – Francisco Varallo, Argentine footballer (born 1910)
- 2013 – William C. Campbell, American golfer (born 1923)
- 2013 – Howie Crittenden, American basketball player and coach (born 1933)
- 2013 – Allan Gotthelf, American philosopher and academic (born 1942)
- 2013 – Seamus Heaney, Irish poet and playwright, Nobel Prize laureate (born 1939)
- 2013 – Leo Lewis, American football player and coach (born 1933)
- 2014 – Charles Bowden, American non-fiction author, journalist and essayist (born 1945)
- 2014 – Bipan Chandra, Indian historian and academic (born 1928)
- 2014 – Igor Decraene, Belgian cyclist (born 1996)
- 2014 – Andrew V. McLaglen, English-American director and producer (born 1920)
- 2014 – Felipe Osterling, Peruvian lawyer and politician (born 1932)
- 2015 – Wes Craven, American director, producer, screenwriter, and actor (born 1939)
- 2015 – Edward Fadeley, American lawyer and politician (born 1929)
- 2015 – M. M. Kalburgi, Indian scholar, author, and academic (born 1938)
- 2015 – Marvin Mandel, American lawyer and politician, 56th Governor of Maryland (born 1920)
- 2015 – Oliver Sacks, English-American neurologist, author, and academic (born 1933)
- 2017 – Louise Hay, American motivational author (born 1926)
- 2017 – Skip Prokop, Canadian drummer, guitarist and keyboardist (born 1943)
- 2019 – Valerie Harper, American actress and writer (born 1939)
- 2022 – Mikhail Gorbachev, 8th and final leader of the Soviet Union (born 1931)
- 2024 – Tūheitia Paki, Māori King (born 1955)
- 2024 – Fatman Scoop, American rapper, hype man and radio personality (born 1971)

== Holidays and observances ==
- Christian feast day:
  - Alexander of Constantinople (Eastern Orthodoxy)
  - Blessed Alfredo Ildefonso Schuster
  - Blessed Eustáquio van Lieshout
  - Blessed Stephen Nehmé (Maronite Church / Catholic Church)
  - Charles Chapman Grafton (Episcopal Church)
  - Fantinus
  - Felix and Adauctus
  - Fiacre
  - Blessed María Rafols Bruna
  - Mary Ward
  - Narcisa de Jesús
  - Pammachius
  - Theodosius of Oria
  - August 30 (Eastern Orthodox liturgics)
- Constitution Day (Kazakhstan)
- Constitution Day (Turks and Caicos Islands)
- Independence Day (Tatarstan, Russia not formally recognized)
- International Day of the Disappeared
- International Whale Shark Day
- Popular Consultation Day (East Timor)
- Saint Rose of Lima's Day (Peru)
- Victory Day (Turkey)
