= Siege of Memel (1757) =

Siege of Seven Years War

- Part of Part of the Third Silesian War (Seven Years' War)
- Plan of Klaipėda Castle (1742)
Date	19 June – 5 July 1757 (O.S); 30 June – 16 July 1757 (N.S.)
Location	Fortress of Memel, Memel, East Prussia, Kingdom of Prussia (present-day Klaipėda, Lithuania)
Result	Russian victory
Territorial changes	Memel occupied by Russian forces

Belligerents
Russian Empire	Kingdom of Prussia

Commanders and leaders
(Russian Empire) William Fermor (Russian Empire) Stepan Apraksin (Russian Empire) Zakhar Mishukov	(Kingdom of Prussia) Christoph Ernst von Rummel (Kingdom of Prussia) Hans von Lehwaldt

Strength
16,000 troops 20 Siege Guns Bombardment squadron (6 vessels)	800 Landmiliz 80 guns

Casualties and losses
Approximately 25 killed and wounded	180 prisoners Military and civilian casualties unknown 104 artillery pieces captured

The Siege of Memel was the first major Russian military success during the Seven Years' War and the opening operation of the Russian campaign in East Prussia. As part of Russia's strategy to weaken Frederick II and fulfill its alliance obligations with Austria, the operation aimed to secure an important Baltic port that could serve as a supply base for Russian operations. In June 1757, a Russian corps commanded by General William Fermor, supported by a squadron of the Russian Baltic Fleet, besieged the Prussian fortress of Memel (modern-day Klaipėda). Defended by a small garrison under Lieutenant Colonel Christoph Ernst von Rummel, the fortress surrendered after a brief siege, becoming the first Prussian fortress captured by Russia during the war. The occupation of Memel provided the Russian Imperial Army with a strategic logistical base for further operations in East Prussia and marked the beginning of Russia's direct military campaign against Prussia.

== The Diplomatic Background ==
Following the Treaty of Nystad in 1721, the Russian Empire emerged as a major European power, particularly in the Baltic Sea region. The decline of Swedish influence allowed Russia, under Peter I and his successors, to expand its diplomatic and military influence in Northern Europe. At the same time, Russia's rivalry with the Ottoman Empire encouraged closer relations with the Habsburg monarchy, which shared Russian concerns regarding Ottoman influence in the Balkans and the balance of power in Central Europe.

These common interests led to the Treaty of Vienna of 1726, which established a formal alliance between Russia and Austria. Despite the political instability following the deaths of Peter I and Catherine I, including the reigns of Peter II, Anna, Ivan VI, and Elizabeth, cooperation between the two empires remained one of the foundations of European diplomacy during the first half of the eighteenth century.

The alliance was strengthened through Russian participation in the War of the Polish Succession and the War of the Austrian Succession, during which Russia supported Maria Theresa. It was formally renewed by the Treaty of Saint Petersburg of 1746, which required each state to provide up to 30,000 troops—20,000 infantry and 10,000 cavalry—within three months if the other was attacked, while also reaffirming broader military and logistical cooperation. This renewed cooperation alarmed Frederick II of Prussia, who viewed the Austro-Russian alliance as a potential threat to Prussian expansion and influence in Central Europe.

Russian concerns regarding Prussia increased after Frederick II's seizure of Silesia and the rapid growth of Prussian military power. Russian statesmen, particularly Chancellor Alexey Bestuzhev-Ryumin, increasingly considered Prussia the principal obstacle to Russian security and to the European balance of power established after the previous wars.

These concerns shaped Russian military policy in 1756. On 15 March of that year, the Imperial Conference approved a strategy directed against Prussia, which was endorsed by Empress Elizabeth. The plan aimed to prevent further Prussian expansion and reduce Frederick II's power to a level that would no longer threaten Russian interests. It called for military coordination with Austria, preparations of the Russian Imperial Army, diplomatic efforts to secure the movement of Russian forces through the Polish–Lithuanian Commonwealth, the preservation of Swedish and Ottoman neutrality, and cooperation with France to prevent interference with the coalition's plans.

The Diplomatic Revolution of 1756 transformed the European alliance system by bringing Austria and France together, but it did not alter Russia's determination to oppose Prussia. Saint Petersburg remained committed to its alliance with Vienna and joined the anti-Prussian coalition despite British and Prussian diplomatic attempts to prevent such cooperation.

Frederick II's pre-emptive invasion of the Electorate of Saxony in August 1756 transformed the diplomatic crisis into the Third Silesian War and accelerated Russian preparations for intervention. During the winter of 1756–1757, the Russian government converted its diplomatic commitments into operational planning and concentrated forces for an invasion of East Prussia. Within this framework, the fortress and port of Memel was selected as the opening objective of the Russian campaign, both to secure a Baltic supply base and to support the subsequent advance into East Prussia.

Contemporary Prussian publications presented a different interpretation of the origins of the conflict. The alliance between Austria and Russia was portrayed as a defensive arrangement that had existed for years without justification for war, while Frederick II was presented as the victim of an aggressive coalition formed by the European powers.

== Russian Preparations ==
Following the decisions of the Imperial Conference in March 1756, Russian foreign and military policy became increasingly focused on limiting the power and expansion of Prussia. The strategic program approved by the Conference established the foundations of Russia's future intervention by calling for close military coordination with the Habsburg Monarchy, diplomatic measures to prevent foreign interference, negotiations with the Polish–Lithuanian Commonwealth to secure the movement of Russian forces, and preparations for offensive operations by the Russian Imperial Army against Frederick II.

Although Russia possessed one of the largest standing armies in Europe at the beginning of the Seven Years' War, its military preparations were affected by significant organizational difficulties. According to the establishment returns compiled by the War College in 1755, the Russian military consisted of approximately 331,000 men, including the field army, garrison troops, artillery and engineer formations, land M=militia, and irregular cavalry. For offensive operations, Russia could theoretically deploy around 220,000 field and irregular troops; however, the forces actually available for the 1757 campaign were considerably lower due to shortages, detachments, and incomplete formations.

Prussian observers also recognized the considerable scale of the Russian military effort assembled for the invasion of East Prussia. The Russian army operating under Field Marshal Stepan Fyodorovich Apraksin included regular infantry and cavalry formations as well as large numbers of irregular troops, supported by several hundred artillery pieces. Contemporary assessments emphasized the quality of the Russian grenadiers, who were regarded as the core of the army, alongside the discipline and training of the musketeer regiments.

The army assigned to Field Marshal Apraksin's command was particularly affected by recent reforms. The creation of new Grenadier regiments and the formation of Shuvalov's Observation Corps required the redistribution of experienced soldiers and officers from existing infantry formations, weakening several regiments intended for field operations. According to Dmitry Maslovsky, Apraksin's army began the campaign approximately 9,000 men below its authorized strength, with shortages reaching around 12,000 when non-combatants were included.

Despite these administrative and organizational problems, Maslovsky argued that the Russian army under Empress Elizabeth was considerably more effective than contemporary critics had suggested. The officer and non-commissioned officer corps possessed extensive military experience, while the long period of service and the recruitment system contributed to the endurance and discipline of the infantry. Although logistical and administrative weaknesses remained significant challenges, the regular infantry represented one of the strongest elements of the Russian military system at the beginning of the Seven Years' War.

Following the Prussian invasion of Saxony in August 1756, the Russian government transformed its political commitments into concrete military planning. On 5 October 1756, the Imperial Conference issued detailed instructions to Field Marshal Stepan Fyodorovich Apraksin, defining both the strategic objectives and practical requirements of the forthcoming campaign. Russia justified its intervention through its alliance obligations with Austria and Saxony, but also through its own interest in preventing further Prussian expansion. Since Russian forces could not immediately cooperate with the Austrian army in the main theatre of war, Apraksin was ordered to conduct an independent offensive into East Prussia in order to divert Prussian forces away from Central Europe.

The instructions issued to Apraksin established the operational foundations of the Russian campaign. Troops were to be concentrated in Livonia and Courland, supply depots established, siege artillery and transport prepared, intelligence gathered on Prussian positions and communications, and cooperation between the army and the Russian Baltic Fleet organized for future operations along the Baltic coast. Following the capitulation of Memel, the Russian command incorporated the fortress into the logistical framework of the East Prussian campaign. The port was particularly valuable because Russian planners had already designated Memel as one of the magazines to be supplied from Saint Petersburg by the transport fleet. From Libau, supplies for Fermor's detachment were transported toward Memel by inland waterways and by wagon columns, allowing the Russian force operating against the fortress to maintain its advance.

The objectives of the campaign were further clarified during the Russian Military Council of 17 February 1757. The commanders concluded that the purpose of the invasion was not merely the occupation of Königsberg, but the destruction of the Prussian field army in East Prussia. The council emphasized that the direction of the advance and the crossing points over the Neman River should remain flexible and dependent on the position of Prussian forces rather than being determined solely by theoretical plans.

== Mobilization of the Russian Army ==
During the second half of 1756, the Russian government transformed the strategic decisions adopted earlier in the year into practical military preparations. The campaign against Prussia required not only the concentration of a large field army, but also the organization of supply systems, transport, naval cooperation and intelligence networks necessary for an offensive operation beyond Russia's western frontier.

At the beginning of the Seven Years' War, the Russian Empire possessed one of the largest military establishments in Europe. According to the official returns compiled by the War College in 1755, the Russian armed forces consisted of approximately 331,422 men, including field troops, garrison forces, artillery and engineer formations, the land militia, and irregular cavalry units. However, only a portion of this establishment could be employed in offensive operations. The field army consisted of approximately 176,073 regular troops, supported by around 43,733 irregular troops, providing Russia with roughly 220,000 men theoretically available for active service.

The infantry formations intended for active operations had already undergone major organizational changes before the beginning of the campaign. Before the war, the Russian infantry consisted of three Guards regiments and forty-six army infantry regiments. On 30 March 1756 (O.S.), thirty-two regiments were placed on a full war establishment, allowing them to undertake field operations, while the remaining formations were retained for internal security duties and reserve purposes.

The rapid reorganization of the army, however, created temporary weaknesses within the forces assigned to Field Marshal Stepan Apraksin. The creation of new Grenadier regiments required the transfer of grenadier companies from existing infantry units, while the formation of Count Pyotr Ivanovich Shuvalov's Observation Corps required additional transfers of experienced soldiers from regiments stationed inside Russia. According to Dmitry Maslovsky, Apraksin's army entered the campaign approximately 9,000 men below its authorized establishment, with the shortage increasing to around 12,000 when non-combatants were included.

Despite these deficiencies, the army assembled under Apraksin represented a considerable force. According to Maslovsky's tabulation of the army's organization, the infantry comprised 82,976 men, of whom 71,947 were listed in the intermediate strength column. The regular cavalry numbered 19,414 men, while approximately 23,000 irregular troops were assigned to the army. The artillery establishment included 2,726 men with the field artillery and a further 276 personnel assigned to the siege artillery, while 120 miners were available for engineering operations. The combined nominal strength of these forces amounted to 128,512 men, although only approximately 97,848 were represented in the intermediate strength figures.

The concentration of the army was carried out mainly around Riga, Courland and the Dvina River. Infantry, cavalry, hussar and Cossack formations assembled in these regions before the planned invasion of East Prussia. At the same time, the Russian Baltic Fleet was prepared to support operations along the Baltic coast, while siege artillery, ammunition and other military equipment were transported to Riga in preparation for the campaign.

The Russian army also faced limitations in its bridging equipment. Apraksin's army possessed thirty copper pontoons, each weighing approximately 35 puds, sufficient to construct a bridge about 55 sazhen in length. However, the pontoon train moved slowly with the army, and the construction of bridges was itself time-consuming. The limited carrying capacity of the pontoons also required them to be placed closely together when heavier loads had to cross, complicating the movement of artillery and other equipment.

Considerable attention was given to the logistical requirements of the invasion. Russian authorities organized the accumulation of provisions, forage, transport animals and supply depots, while military officials collected maps, fortress plans and intelligence regarding roads, communications and strategic routes throughout East Prussia, Lithuania and Poland. Irregular formations, including Don Cossacks, Sloboda Cossacks, Kalmyks, Bashkirs and Kampaniyskiy units, were assigned supporting roles in reconnaissance, raiding and screening operations, increasing the army's ability to operate in unfamiliar territory.

By the end of 1756, the concentration of Russian forces along the western frontier had progressed significantly. Reports submitted by Apraksin recorded the arrival of regular cavalry, Cossack formations and other detachments in assembly areas across Livonia, Courland, Lithuania and Poland, creating the force intended for the invasion of East Prussia.

The army prepared for the invasion of East Prussia while still facing significant logistical difficulties. Contemporary Prussian observers noted that although Russian artillery possessed excellent equipment, the army lacked an independent supply transport system, forcing it to rely heavily on requisitioned local transportation. The Russian army was also affected by institutional problems at the highest level. In January 1756, the newly established Conference at the Imperial Court assumed responsibility for directing the strategic operations of the army, while the commander-in-chief, Field Marshal Stepan Apraksin, became dependent on the Conference for major decisions. This arrangement weakened the independence of the army's field command and complicated the administration of military operations and supplies. These deficiencies complicated operations and contributed to difficulties in maintaining supplies during the campaign. The Russian army was also affected by administrative problems at the highest level. In 1756, the newly established Conference at the Imperial Court assumed responsibility not only for directing the operations of the active army but also for its supply and various related administrative matters, while the War College retained responsibility for much of the army's ordinary administration. The division of responsibilities complicated the transmission of information and contributed to delays in dealing with the army's logistical needs.

The operational timetable was reconsidered during the Russian military councils of January 1757. Reports concerning shortages of provisions, especially forage in Lithuania and Courland, convinced the commanders that an immediate winter offensive would expose the army to unacceptable risks. On 23 January, the council postponed the main invasion until spring, when fresh pasture would support transport animals and additional supplies could be accumulated. The commanders concluded that no major advance could begin before sufficient logistical preparations had been completed, as shortages and the incomplete readiness of the cavalry made an earlier offensive impracticable.

== Advance on Memel ==
By early June 1757, the Russian army had completed the concentration of forces required for the invasion of East Prussia. On 7 June, Field Marshal Stepan Fyodorovich Apraksin reported to Empress Elizabeth that the First and Second Divisions had assembled around Kovno, while additional columns occupied Olita, Grodno and other positions along the Neman River. The army was prepared to begin operations once the remaining supply columns, baggage trains and field bakeries had been organized. However, Apraksin emphasized that the difficult terrain of Lithuania and East Prussia, characterized by forests, marshes and poor roads, required continued reconnaissance before the army could advance into Prussian territory.

The operation against Memel was conducted simultaneously with the wider Russian advance into East Prussia. While the main army prepared to cross the Neman River, the detached corps under General-in-Chief William Fermor was assigned the task of reducing the northernmost Prussian fortress on the Baltic coast. The capture of Memel depended on close cooperation between land forces, siege artillery and naval units operating in the Baltic.

The naval forces supporting the expedition were assembled during the spring of 1757. On 1 May, the detachment assigned to support the siege departed from Kronstadt, consisting of the ship Gavriil, the frigates Vakhmeister and Selafail, the floating batteries (prams) Elefant and Dikii Byk, the bombardment vessels Jupiter and Donder, and the galiot Rak. The bombardment vessels transported heavy ammunition and siege equipment, while the frigates provided protection and assistance to the slower vessels during their passage across the Baltic.

The naval expedition encountered severe difficulties during the voyage. Storms in early May scattered the detachment and damaged several vessels. The bombardment ship Jupiter lost its bowsprit and foremast, while Gavriil suffered structural damage and severe leaks after grounding on a sandbank while attempting to assist Donder, which had been separated from the formation by the weather. The frigate Selafail and the pram Dikii Byk also sustained damage, delaying the expedition until repairs could be completed at sea and later near Libau (today Liepāja).

By the end of May, the flotilla had regrouped at Libau, where damaged vessels were repaired and preparations continued. On 4 June, Fermor inspected the naval detachment and ordered it to prepare for active operations. The arrival of Admiral Mishukov's squadron on 14 June completed the concentration of naval forces required for the expedition. Between 15 and 17 June, the Russian flotilla sailed toward Memel, and upon reaching the fortress armed boats immediately surveyed the channels leading toward the Curonian Lagoon.

On 17 June, Apraksin ordered Fermor to begin operations against Memel without delay. Intelligence reports indicated that the fortress possessed only a weak garrison and that no major Prussian field force was operating nearby. The Russian commander considered the rapid capture of Memel essential before reinforcements could arrive. According to Anisimov, Fermor's corps had originally been planned to contain approximately 27,000 men, but the force actually available for the operation numbered only around 16,000 troops. Nevertheless, Apraksin considered this sufficient because of the weakness of the fortress defenses and the limited strength of the Prussian garrison.

Apraksin informed Fermor that siege artillery was being transported from Riga, additional infantry and recruits were reinforcing the Courland Corps, and Rear Admiral Lewis's squadron, together with Cossack detachments operating from the galleys, would support the expedition by disrupting Prussian communications around Königsberg. He described the capture of Memel as a matter of great necessity for the success of the campaign.

While Russian forces prepared the operation against Memel, Prussian forces under Field Marshal Hans von Lehwaldt attempted to monitor the approaches to East Prussia. Four battalions and twenty-three squadrons under Generals Kanitz and Ruesch were stationed along the Memel River to observe the crossings and prevent a surprise advance. However, the Prussian army faced increasing logistical difficulties, as its supplies from the magazines at Tilsit and Ragnit were gradually exhausted.

On 16 June 1757, after three days of deliberations, Apraksin reported that the Russian military council had completed the final arrangements for the invasion of East Prussia. The commanders reviewed the difficulties created by forests, marshes and poor communications, as well as the necessity of securing adequate supplies before beginning the advance. Russian engineers completed one bridge across the Neman River while constructing another, allowing the vanguard to begin crossing on the following day. The army's bridging equipment nevertheless imposed practical limitations: Apraksin's pontoon train consisted of heavy copper pontoons that were slow to transport and time-consuming to assemble, while heavier loads required the pontoons to be placed closely together.

A return prepared by Apraksin on the eve of the invasion demonstrated both the strength and limitations of the army. The field army contained 65,187 officers and men fit for duty, supported by 19,825 horses. However, 7,353 soldiers were listed as sick and another 7,217 men were detached for other assignments. The army remained below its authorized establishment by 17,173 soldiers and 1,926 horses, showing that its effective strength was considerably lower than its theoretical organization suggested.

Apraksin also reported that sickness, incomplete formations and other absences reduced the army's operational capacity. More than 33,000 men were unavailable because of illness, detached service or incomplete units, while the Memel Corps alone contained more than 2,000 sick soldiers. The commander also noted deficiencies among the cavalry, particularly the poor condition of many remount horses, which had arrived late from Russia and required reorganization before active operations.

By mid-June 1757, the Russian expedition against Memel had assembled its principal elements: William Fermor's land corps, siege artillery transported from Russian, and naval forces capable of supporting the reduction of the fortress. The operation represented the opening Russian siege action of the Seven Years' War and demonstrated the combination of military, naval and logistical preparations that characterized the Russian campaign in East Prussia.

Lloyd likewise stated that the fourth Russian column, commanded by General William Fermor, had been specifically assigned to besiege Memel from the outset of the campaign.

== Situation of the Fortress of Memel ==
Before the Russian invasion of East Prussia, the fortress of Memel represented the northernmost defensive position of the Prussian monarchy and an important strategic point on the Baltic coast. Located near the Curonian Lagoon and separated from the main territory of East Prussia by the Neman River, Memel occupied a unique position within the Prussian defensive system. Its capture would secure the northern flank of the Russian advance and provide a Baltic port capable of supporting future operations in East Prussia.

The defensive situation of East Prussia was limited by the scarcity of available forces and the weakness of its fortifications. In 1757, Field Marshal Hans von Lehwaldt commanded a force of approximately 28,000 men in the province, consisting of 26 battalions and 50 squadrons, supported by 64 artillery pieces. To compensate for the shortage of regular troops, Lehwaldt organized newly recruited men into a depot at Königsberg and formed six Landmiliz companies, primarily intended for garrison duties and coastal defense.

According to Henry Lloyd, Field Marshal Hans von Lehwaldt not only concentrated his army near Insterburg but also detached a corps toward the Memel region to observe Russian movements along the frontier.

According to a contemporary Prussian account, Field Marshal Hans von Lehwaldt anticipated that Memel would become the first Russian objective and initially reinforced the fortress with three regiments and a considerable number of sailors. However, as the Russian army concentrated for the invasion of East Prussia, Lehwaldt feared that these forces could be isolated and withdrew toward Insterburg, leaving Memel under the command of Lieutenant Colonel Christoph Ernst von Rummel.

The possibility of relieving Memel was also limited by the logistical situation of the Prussian army. According to Prussian military accounts, Lehwaldt had been criticized by Captain Gaudi for failing to secure additional supplies that could have prolonged operations in the region and potentially allowed an attempt to assist the fortress. However, the same assessment concluded that any relief operation would probably have achieved no lasting success due to the approach of the main Russian army.

The weakness of Memel's defenses reflected broader problems within the defensive system of East Prussia. Contemporary Prussian military assessments noted that the fortifications of the province had not been placed in a fully satisfactory condition before the Russian invasion. Even Königsberg, despite its importance as a military and administrative center, was considered capable of resisting little more than a sudden attack rather than a prolonged siege.

By the beginning of the siege, the fortress was defended by approximately 800 men of the Landmiliz and possessed around 80 artillery pieces. Russian intelligence considered the garrison insufficient for a prolonged defense, and Field Marshal Stepan Apraksin instructed General-in-Chief Willim Fermor to capture Memel as quickly as possible, as the fortress lacked adequate troops and nearby Prussian forces capable of providing relief.

Despite efforts to provision the fortress, Prussian officers considered Memel difficult to defend against a determined siege. The limited interior space of the fortress restricted its ability to withstand prolonged bombardment, while its garrison consisted of only one Landmiliz battalion. Although Memel possessed around 80 iron cannons, only 24 artillerymen were available for their operation, significantly limiting the effectiveness of its defenses.

== Siege ==
After the Russian expedition reached Memel, General-in-Chief Willim Fermor began systematic siege operations against the fortress. Although the Russian corps greatly outnumbered the defenders, Fermor decided against an immediate assault and instead prepared a formal siege, ordering his troops to establish approaches toward the fortifications. The operation combined land-based siege works with naval support, as Russian engineers advanced the trenches while the Russian Baltic Fleet and bombardment vessels secured the maritime approaches and supported the attack from the sea.

The conduct of the siege was broadly consistent with a Russian practice of employing artillery aggressively during the opening stages of an operation against a fortified position. According to the military writer Tielke, as cited by Maslovsky, Russian forces commonly brought their guns as close as practicable to the fortress before constructing covered siege works and mortar batteries, bombarding the position for approximately 24–48 hours before beginning extensive trench operations. Laskovsky later criticized this practice for delaying the establishment of fully developed siege batteries.

The Russian naval operation also exposed weaknesses in the preparations of the fortress. According to a Prussian account, the commander had failed to obstruct the entrance to the Curonian Lagoon, allowing the Russian fleet to enter the Haff and support the siege from the sea. Memel was subsequently bombarded from both land and sea before capitulating on 6 July 1757 (N.S.).

Before the beginning of the bombardment, Fermor demanded the surrender of the fortress, but Lieutenant Colonel Christoph Ernst von Rummel refused and ordered the burning of the suburbs outside the walls. During the night, Russian troops brought their artillery closer to the fortress under the cover of the fires. On 20 June, Russian land batteries and the naval squadron began bombarding Memel. The siege artillery included four howitzers, five 24-pounder guns, five 18-pounder guns and six mortars, while Russian naval vessels supported the bombardment from the sea.

During the night of 22 June, Russian troops extended their siege approaches into a second parallel, advancing to approximately 150 sazhen (around 320 metres) from the fortress. Throughout the night, artillery batteries in the first parallel maintained continuous fire against the defenses, while mortars bombarded the town with explosive shells. After the second parallel had been completed the following morning, heavy guns and mortars were moved forward and immediately began firing from the new position, increasing pressure on the Prussian garrison.

To protect the siege works from a possible Prussian relief attempt, Fermor ordered the first and second brigades to establish a fortified camp beyond the Dange River. This position allowed Russian forces to cover the approaches to the fortress and intercept any enemy force advancing from the surrounding countryside. On the following day, the third brigade, including the Chernigov Infantry Regiment and Vyatka Infantry Regiment, crossed newly constructed bridges and occupied positions between the two existing brigades, completing the defensive arrangements around the siege lines.

On 23 June, fresh working parties equipped with entrenching tools replaced earlier detachments and continued extending the siege trenches toward the fortress from another sector. At the same time, Russian batteries established in the parallels, together with bombardment vessels and floating batteries positioned offshore, maintained a continuous bombardment using explosive bombs, heated shot and solid cannonballs.

The siege was accompanied by operations against the surrounding countryside. Fermor dispatched Major Romanius with approximately 500 Cossacks and 200 hussars to gather intelligence, disrupt Prussian communications and secure supplies for the army. Romanius reported that no regular Prussian troops were present between the Memel River and Tilsit, although local inhabitants had been armed and instructed by their authorities to resist Russian movements. The detachment secured livestock for Russian forces, while suffering limited casualties during the operation.

By 23 June, Russian artillery had already placed considerable pressure on the fortress. Siege batteries had fired 112 bombs, while the bombardment vessels launched an additional 297 bombs against Memel. Land batteries discharged 36 heated shot and 333 solid cannonballs, while the floating batteries fired 1,690 rounds against the defenses. Despite the intensity of the bombardment, Russian casualties remained limited; according to the siege journal, two grenadiers were killed and three infantrymen wounded by Prussian fire during the operations.

Despite the successful outcome of the operation, later Russian military historians questioned some aspects of Fermor's conduct of the siege. Dmitry Maslovsky argued that the siege works were unnecessary against a small fortress defended by a weak garrison and that Memel could likely have been taken by assault. F. F. Laskovsky also noted that Fermor's corps had brought provisions for only five days and that the expedition lacked a major part of its assigned siege artillery. Had Rummel prolonged the defense for several additional days, the Russian corps might have been forced to withdraw.

Contemporary Prussian accounts emphasized the determination of the garrison, portraying Lieutenant Colonel Rummel's decision to continue resisting despite overwhelming Russian superiority as an attempt to preserve the honor of the fortress and avoid surrender before the defenses had become untenable.

Facing the steady advance of the Russian siege works, the continuous bombardment and the absence of any immediate prospect of relief by Prussian field forces, the garrison entered negotiations for surrender. Memel capitulated on 25 June 1757 (O.S.) / 6 July 1757 (N.S.), becoming the first Prussian fortress captured by the Russian Empire during the Seven Years' War.

The capitulation allowed the Prussian garrison to withdraw with the honors of war, although it required the surrender of royal funds, military stores and official documents. The agreement also guaranteed the inhabitants of Memel the preservation of their property, religious privileges and civil rights.

== Aftermath ==
Following the capitulation of Memel, the Russian command immediately incorporated the fortress into the logistical framework of the East Prussian campaign. General-in-Chief Willim Fermor organized the occupation of the town, secured captured military supplies and supervised the restoration of damaged defenses. The port facilities of Memel provided the Russian army with an important base for receiving supplies and supporting further operations along the Baltic coast.

Following the surrender, the Prussian garrison was permitted to withdraw from Memel with its arms, rather than being taken into Russian captivity. The decision was later criticized by Field Marshal Stepan Apraksin, who believed that valuable intelligence could have been obtained from captured documents and prisoners.

The capture of Memel considerably improved the logistical situation of the Russian expedition in East Prussia. Control of the port allowed provisions, ammunition, artillery equipment and other supplies to be transported by sea from Russian Baltic ports, reducing the difficulties associated with overland supply routes through Courland and Lithuania. The fortress also secured the northern flank of the Russian advance and provided a permanent base for subsequent operations in the region.

Before the capture of Memel, the Russian command had already incorporated the fortress into its planned supply network. In late June 1757, arrangements were made for the magazines at Libau and Memel to be replenished from Saint Petersburg by the Russian transport fleet. Fermor's detachment operating against Memel was to draw its supplies from the magazine at Libau, with provisions transported from Libau to Memel both by inland waterways and by fifteen continuously operating wagon columns. Alexander Suvorov, then serving under the stage commander in Courland, was assigned to supervise this supply operation.

The capture of Memel was immediately followed by further Russian movements into East Prussia. Prussian reports received on 25 June 1757 noted that General Willim Fermor had left Memel and was advancing toward Tilsit, while the main Russian army under Field Marshal Stepan Apraksin continued its advance from Kovno into East Prussia. At the same time, Russian naval forces threatened operations against the Samland coast, demonstrating that the fall of Memel formed part of a wider offensive against the province rather than an isolated siege.

The fall of Memel also caused immediate concern among the Prussian command. When Field Marshal Hans von Lehwaldt received news of the fortress's surrender at his camp near Insterburg, several of his generals argued that the army should withdraw closer to Königsberg. They feared that the presence of the Russian Baltic Fleet in the Curonian Lagoon would allow Russian forces to launch a landing near Schallken or Labiau and capture Königsberg by a sudden assault. Lehwaldt initially rejected a withdrawal, arguing that abandoning his position would prevent him from observing the enemy armies and would deprive his forces of supplies from Lithuania.

The Russian occupation of Memel also had political and military consequences beyond the immediate siege. As the first Prussian fortress captured by Russia during the Seven Years' War, its fall demonstrated that the Russian invasion of East Prussia had achieved its initial objective and provided a symbolic success for Empress Elizabeth's government. The capture strengthened Russia's position in the campaign and created the conditions for further advances into Prussian territory.

After securing Memel, Russian authorities reorganized the administration of the captured territory. A permanent garrison was established, military stores were secured and the fortress was prepared as a depot for provisions and equipment required for future operations. From this position, Fermor's detached forces continued operations along the Baltic coast, advancing southward and occupying Tilsit without resistance on 20 July 1757 (O.S.) / 31 July 1757 (N.S.). Following the Russian advance, local authorities in Tilsit and the surrounding district of Ragnit recognized Russian authority.

In his official report to Empress Elizabeth, Field Marshal Stepan Apraksin praised Fermor's leadership, particularly the rapid execution of the siege and the effective cooperation between the army and naval forces. However, he criticized several aspects of the capitulation agreement, especially the decision to allow the Prussian garrison to withdraw with its weapons and ammunition. Apraksin also regretted that the fortress commandant had not been thoroughly interrogated and that correspondence from Field Marshal Hans von Lehwaldt had not been seized, believing that these documents could have provided valuable intelligence regarding Prussian military plans.

The capture of Memel represented the first successful Russian territorial operation of the Seven Years' War. Although the siege itself was brief, the fortress became an important logistical point for the Russian campaign in East Prussia and supported Apraksin's subsequent advance toward Königsberg and the interior of the province.

Military writer Henry Lloyd likewise argued that, if the Russians intended to maintain operations in East Prussia, their first priority should have been to establish a large supply magazine at Memel, from which the army could be provisioned throughout the campaign.

Memel remained under Russian occupation for the rest of the war and continued to serve as an important supply depot for Russian operations in East Prussia.

== Sources ==
- Die Einnahme der Festung Memel in Ostpreussen von den Russisch-Kaiserlichen Truppen, unter den Befehlen des General von Fermer, den 6ten Julius 1757 [The Capture of the Fortress of Memel in East Prussia by the Russian Imperial Troops under the Command of General Fermor, 6 July 1757] (Contemporary German account of the siege) (in German). 1757.
- Zolotarev, Vladimir Antonovich; Kozlov, Ivan Alekseyevich (2003). Три столетия Российского флота [Three Centuries of the Russian Fleet]. Военно-историческая библиотека [Military-Historical Library] (in Russian). Vol. 1. Saint Petersburg: Полигон. ISBN 5-89173-198-3.
- Maslovsky, Dmitry Fyodorovich (1886). Русская армия в Семилетнюю войну [The Russian Army in the Seven Years' War] (in Russian). Vol. 1. Moscow: Типография штаба Московского военного округа [Printing House of the Staff of the Moscow Military District].
- Gemanov, Viktor Sergeyevich (2009). История Российского Флота [History of the Russian Fleet] (in Russian) (2nd ed.). Kaliningrad: Yantarnyy Skaz.
- Korobkov, Nikolai Mikhailovich (1940). Семилетняя война. Действия России в 1756–1762 гг [The Seven Years' War. Russia's Operations in 1756–1762] (in Russian). Moscow: Gosudarstvennoye voyennoye izdatelstvo Narkomata oborony SSSR. p. 348.
- Rukavishnikov, Evgeniy Nikolaevich (2018). "Мемель — первая победа России в Семилетней войне 1756–1763 гг" [Memel: Russia's First Victory in the Seven Years' War, 1756–1763]. Военно-исторический журнал [Military-Historical Journal] (in Russian) (11): 4–8.
- Anisimov, Maksim Yuryevich (2016). "Русские осады Семилетней войны 1756–1763 гг" [Russian Sieges During the Seven Years' War, 1756–1763]. История военного дела: исследования и источники [History of Military Affairs: Researches and Sources] (in Russian) (5): 107–135.
- Krinitsyn, F. S. (1951). "Русский флот в Семилетней войне" [The Russian Fleet in the Seven Years' War]. Русское военно-морское искусство [Russian Naval Art] (in Russian). Moscow: Военмориздат. pp. 76–93.
- Kaplan, Herbert H. (1968). Russia and the Outbreak of the Seven Years' War. Berkeley: University of California Press. ISBN 978-0520006232.
- Officers of the Prussian Great General Staff (1824). Geschichte des siebenjährigen Krieges, in einer Reihe von Vorlesungen, mit Benutzung authentischer Quellen. Erster Theil: Die Feldzüge von 1756 und 1757 (in German). Vol. 1. Berlin.
- Lloyd, Henry (1794). Geschichte des siebenjährigen Krieges in Deutschland zwischen dem Könige von Preußen und der Kaiserin Königin mit ihren Alliirten (in German). Vol. 1. Karlsruhe: Christian Gottlieb Schmieder.
