= Sarbinowo, Gmina Dębno =

Sarbinowo
- Village
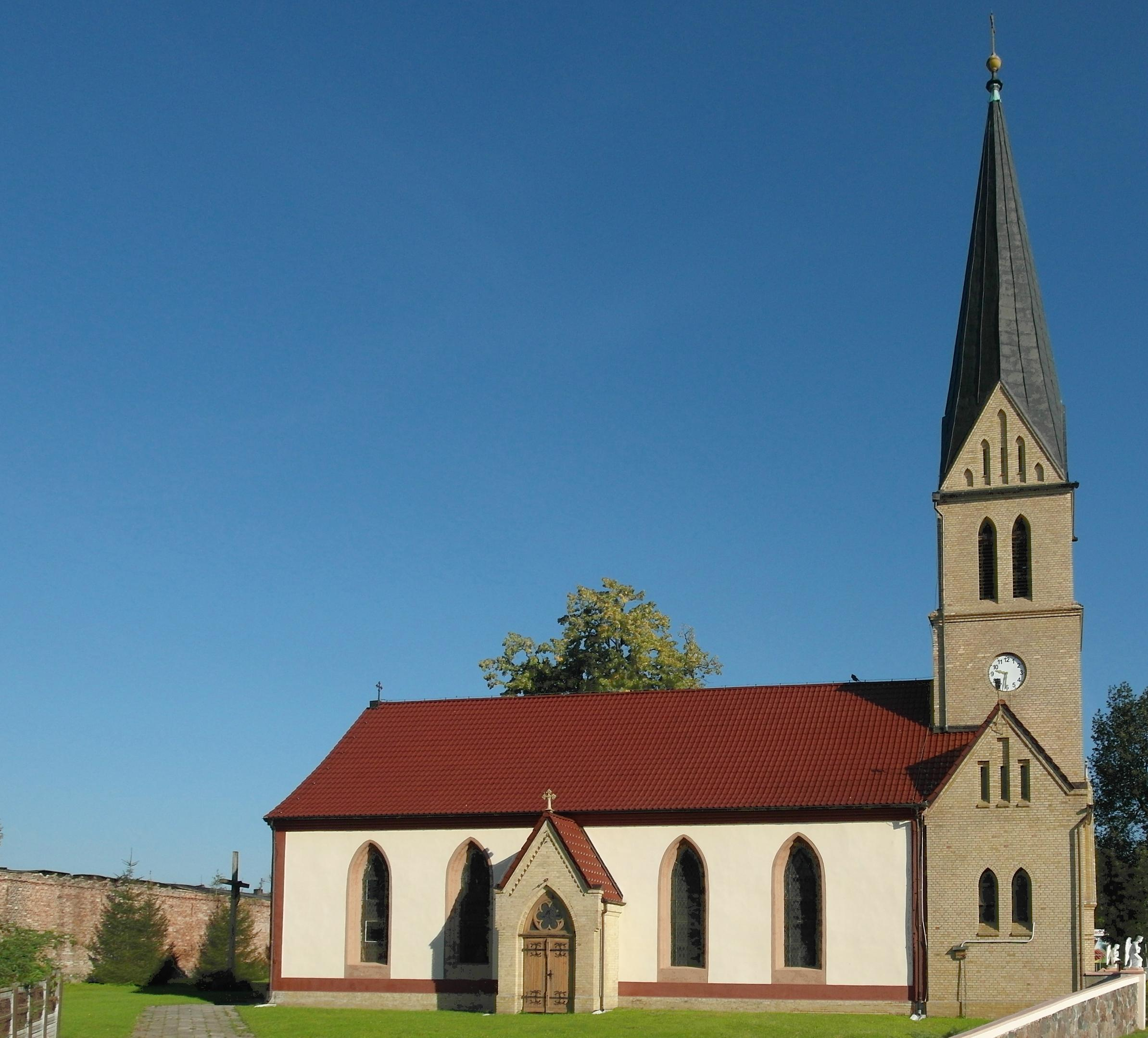
- Catholic church in Sarbinowo

- Location within Poland
- Coordinates: 52°39′27″N 14°40′32″E
- Country: Poland
- Voivodeship: West Pomeranian
- County: Myślibórz
- Gmina: Dębno
- Elevation: 64 m (210 ft)

Population
  - Total: 490
- Time zone: UTC+1 (CET)
  - Summer (DST): UTC+2 (CEST)
- Vehicle registration: ZMY

Sarbinowo [sarbiˈnɔvɔ] (German: Zorndorf) is a village in the administrative district of Gmina Dębno, within Myślibórz County, West Pomeranian Voivodeship, in western Poland. It lies approximately 10 km (6 mi) south of Dębno, 35 km (22 mi) south-west of Myślibórz, and 86 km (53 mi) south of the regional capital Szczecin. The village has a population of 490.

== History ==
The territory formed part of Poland since its establishment in the 10th century. After the fragmentation of Poland into smaller provincial duchies, it formed part of the duchies of Silesia and Greater Poland. Either Henry the Bearded or Władysław Odonic granted the village to the Knights Templar by 1232. The village was first mentioned in 1261 as Torbarmstorp as their possession. It was annexed by the Margraviate of Brandenburg, and included within the New March.

By 1335 it was known as Tzorbensdorf. From 1373, it formed part of the Bohemian (Czech) Crown Lands, ruled by the Luxembourg dynasty. In 1402, the Luxembourgs reached an agreement with Poland in Kraków, by which Poland was to buy and re-incorporate the territory, but eventually the Luxembourgs sold it to the Teutonic Order. In 1540 it fell to John, Margrave of Brandenburg-Küstrin.

It was the scene of the Battle of Zorndorf, in which the Prussians under Frederick the Great fought the Russians commanded by William Fermor, on August 25, 1758. The battle was one of the bloodiest battles of the Seven Years' War. Zorndorf became part of the Province of Brandenburg in 1815 and the German Empire in 1871.

After Germany's defeat in World War II it became again part of Poland.
