= Kisfaludy =

Kisfaludy is a Hungarian surname. Notable people with the surname include:

- Anett Kisfaludy (born 1990), Hungarian handballer
- Atala Kisfaludy (1836–1911), Hungarian poet and writer
- Károly Kisfaludy (1788–1830), Hungarian dramatist and artist, brother of Sándor
  - Kisfaludy Society, a literary society in Pest, founded in 1836
- Lajos Kisfaludy (1924–1988), Hungarian chemical engineer
- Sándor Kisfaludy (1772–1844), Hungarian lyric poet
