= Battle of Gross-Jägersdorf =

Part of the Seven Years' War

Battle of Gross Jägersdorf
- Part of the Third Silesian War (Seven Years' War)
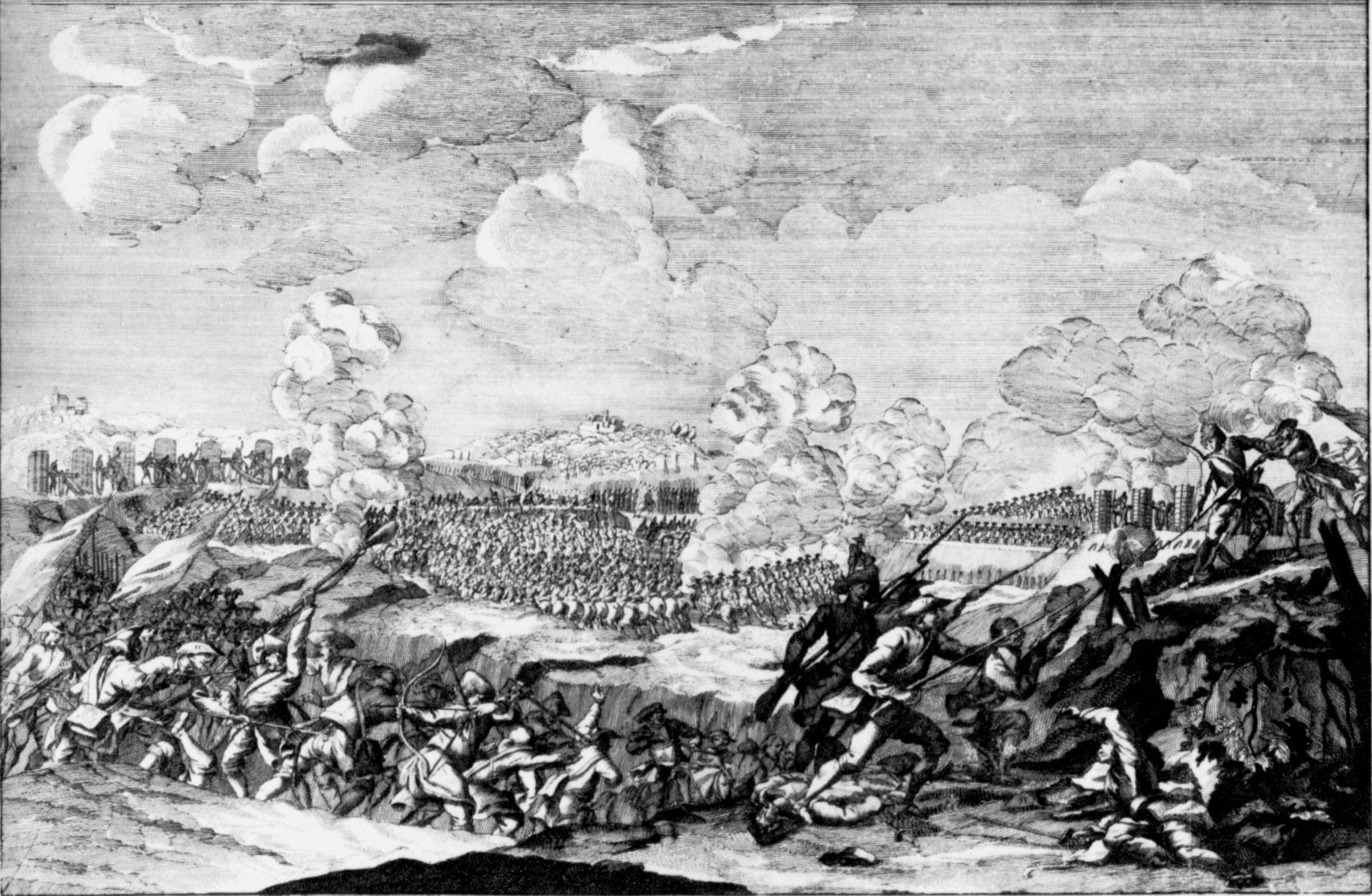
- Cossacks and Kalmyks attack Lehwaldt's army.
Date	30 August 1757 (Note: 19 August 1757 according to the Julian calendar.)
Location	Gross Jägersdorf, East Prussia (today Motornoye, Kaliningrad Oblast) 54.62°N 21.48°E
Result	Russian victory

Belligerents
Russia: Kalmyk Khanate	Prussia

Commanders and leaders
Stepan Apraksin; Pyotr Rumyantsev; Vasily Lopukhin †	Hans von Lehwaldt

Strength
54,800 men	24,700–27,700 men

Casualties and losses
5,400 dead and wounded	4,600 dead and wounded; 28 cannons

The Battle of Gross Jägersdorf (Gross-Jägersdorf; 30 August 1757) was a victory for the Russian force under Field Marshal Stepan Fyodorovich Apraksin over a smaller Prussian force commanded by Field Marshal Hans von Lehwaldt, during the Seven Years' War. This was the first battle in which Russia engaged during the Seven Years' War.

Despite the tactical success, supply problems made a successful advance further into East Prussia impractical. Apraksin decided not to take Königsberg and ordered a withdrawal soon after the battle. Suspecting collusion between Apraksin and Chancellor Alexey Bestuzhev-Ryumin, who had opposed the invasion, Elizabeth of Russia removed Apraksin from command, ordered Bestuzhev-Ryumin to face trial for treason, and appointed William Fermor as the head of the army. Femor led the army back into East Prussia in the following year.

== Seven Years' War ==
Although the Seven Years' War was a global conflict, it took a specific intensity in the European theater based on the recently concluded War of the Austrian Succession (1740–1748). The 1748 Treaty of Aix-la-Chapelle gave Frederick II of Prussia, known as Frederick the Great, the prosperous province of Silesia. Empress Maria Theresa of Austria had signed the treaty to gain time to rebuild her military forces and forge new alliances; she was intent upon regaining ascendancy in the Holy Roman Empire as well as the Silesian province. In 1754, escalating tensions between Britain and France in North America offered France an opportunity to break the British dominance of Atlantic trade. Seeing the opportunity to regain her lost territories and to limit Prussia's growing power, Austria put aside the old rivalry with France to form a new coalition. Faced with this turn of events, Britain aligned herself with the Kingdom of Prussia; this alliance drew in not only the British king's territories held in personal union, including Hanover, but also those of his relatives in the Electorate of Brunswick-Lüneburg and the Landgraviate of Hesse-Kassel. This series of political maneuvers became known as the Diplomatic Revolution.

At the outset of the war, Frederick had one of the finest armies in Europe: his troops – any company – could fire at least four volleys a minute, and some of them could fire five. By the end of 1757, the course of the war had gone well for Prussia, and poorly for Austria. Prussia had achieved spectacular victories at Rossbach and Leuthen and reconquered parts of Silesia that had fallen back to Austria. The Prussians then pressed south into Austrian Moravia. In April 1758, Prussia and Britain concluded the Anglo-Prussian Convention in which the British committed to pay Frederick an annual subsidy of £670,000 (equivalent to about £103,975,839 in 2025). Britain also dispatched 7,000–9,000 troops (Note: Anderson says 7,000. Szabo says 9,000.) to reinforce Frederick's brother-in-law, the Duke Ferdinand of Brunswick-Wolfenbüttel's army. Ferdinand evicted the French from Hanover and Westphalia and re-captured the port of Emden in March 1758; he crossed the Rhine, causing general alarm in France. Despite Ferdinand's victory over the French at the Battle of Krefeld and the brief occupation of Düsseldorf, successful manoeuvres of the larger French forces required him to withdraw across the Rhine.

While Ferdinand and the British allies kept the French busy in the Rhineland, Prussia had to contend with Sweden, Russia, and Austria. There remained a possibility that Prussia could lose Silesia to Austria, Pomerania to Sweden, Magdeburg to Saxony, and East Prussia to Poland or Russia: an entirely nightmarish scenario. In particular, East Prussia was cut off from the rest of Prussia by 500 kilometers (311 mi) of Polish territory, and seemed an easy target, but some Russian court officials – notably Chancellor Alexey Bestuzhev-Ryumin – opposed Russia's entry into what seemed like a largely western European dispute. Bestuzhev-Ryumin did not trust the Prussians, but also had little liking for the French or the British. In this conflict, which grew out of the major realignment of European power diplomacy, it was difficult to determine if the enemy of an enemy was a friend.

== Dispositions ==
The Russian field marshal Stepan Fyodorovich Apraksin commanded an army of approximately 55,000 men and crossed the Niemen. They besieged Memel, which became the army's base for an invasion of the rest of Prussia. Apraxin was cautious, however, and inexperienced in wartime measures. Instead of marching on Wehlau, as was expected, he ordered his forces to cross the Pregel River in safety, near the village of Gross Jägersdorf. The position in East Prussia had stretched the Russian supply lines, and the troops were forced to forage. Foraging quickly degenerated into unruliness and turned into a scorched earth policy, a process that Frederick derided, thinking the Russians undisciplined troops; a disciplined army, the King reasoned, would make quick work of them. They moved on Königsberg, to try to take or at least invest the city.

Frederick sent his 70-year-old Field Marshal Hans von Lehwaldt, who commanded of forces in East Prussia, with 28,000 men; he supplied Lehwaldt with one hundred officers' patents to fill as he saw fit, expecting him to strengthen the army there. He also sent ambiguous orders to take on the Russians whenever his field marshal saw fit. Frederick had not given him specific instructions, just general ones to act when the moment seemed propitious.

== Battle ==
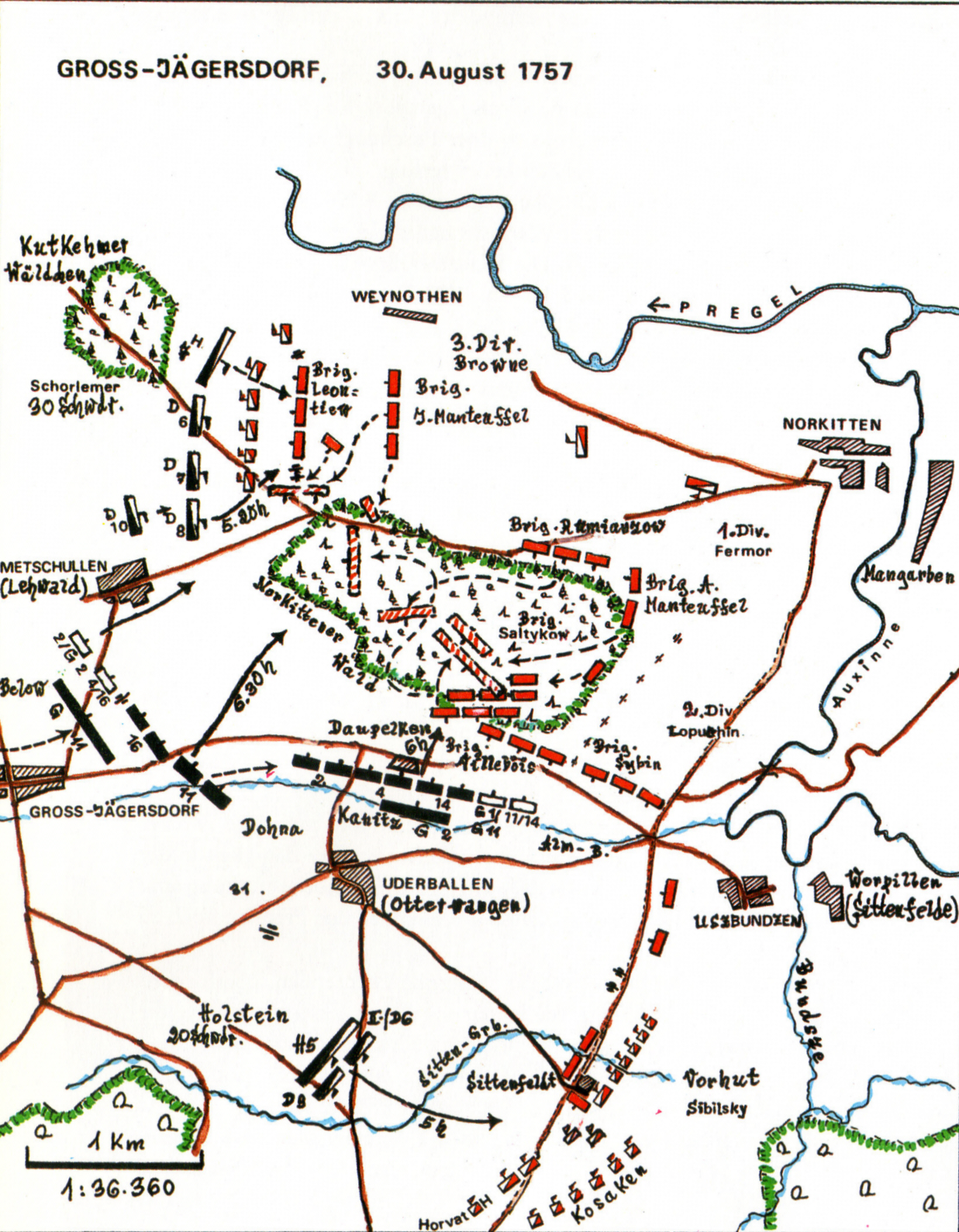
Map of the battle

The Russians started the day with a leisurely march, but the army was undisciplined and difficult to move in any concentrated, organized way. Seeing the opportunity, the Prussians attacked the milling and "unprepared mob" of Russian soldiers. Lehwaldt's cavalry attacked the northern and southern flanks of the Russian army, inflicting initial heavy losses. The Russians, entirely unprepared for an assault by an army half its size, degenerated into further confusion. Apraxin's inexperienced commanders tried to organize the infantry; General Pyotr Rumyantsev, who later became one of Russia's best generals, managed to rally the Russians in the center, as it recovered from the shock of the initial attack. General Vasily Lopukhin was bayoneted by the Prussians: some reports say he died in the arms of his comrades, others, that he died a few days later.

Initially, Lehwaldt's force retained some advantage in the battle. The fierce Prussian assault prevented the Russians from forming the traditional squares with which to repel cavalry, but they did not break and run. Furthermore, observers reported that the main force of Prussians advancing on the center fired volley upon volley with their usual ruthless efficiency. The Russian army recovered from the shock of the initial assault and counter-attacked. Initially mesmerized by the Prussian onslaught, the Russians recovered to shoot back; their return fire was not of the same efficiency, but it was nevertheless effective and the Prussian line eventually collapsed under it. Furthermore, the Kalmyk cavalry and the Don Cossacks, on the Prussian left, pretended to retreat so as to trap the attacking Prussians under heavy artillery fire. This was an effort by Apraksin to encircle the Prussians with his larger army, which Lehwaldt was able to avoid.

Lehwaldt's force retired to its former camp and held its ground there.

== Aftermath ==
The Prussians achieved a surprise attack, seized a number of positions from numerically superior forces and inflicted equivalent losses. As at Zorndorf, they proved to be effective against stronger forces in close-quarter fighting. On the other hand, the Russians, as a Saxon officer remarked, "had neither time nor opportunity to form a square, and yet they did extremely well", despite being taken completely by surprise. Lehwaldt lost between 4,600 and 5,000 casualties and Apraxin, approximately 5,400. Some sources estimate Russian losses as higher: perhaps half again as many casualties, so in the 7,000 range.

Although Lehwaldt withdrew his corps from the battle, and subsequently oversaw the Blockade of Stralsund. The Russian success at Gross Jägersdorf also encouraged Sweden to join the fight against Prussia.

=== Impact on Russian Army ===
In the aftermath, it was popularly expected in Russia that Apraksin would pursue the Prussian retreat and eventually overrun all of East Prussia; he was, after all, only 50 kilometres (31 mi) away from the Königsberg. Inexplicably, the general stopped his advance towards Königsberg and withdrew back into Russia. Historians offer several reasons: after hearing a false report that Empress Elizabeth of Russia had died; to support Peter III as heir to the throne; Apraxin marched on Königsberg but his troops, lacking in supplies, suffered considerable attrition; and, finally, an epidemic of smallpox, which hit the Russian army, especially the Kalmyks, and resulted in 8.5 times more deaths than all the battles fought in 1757.

Recent research suggests that the Russians were entirely unprepared for war beyond their western border and had not realistically evaluated their potential supply problems in East Prussia. Apraxin, at best a modest commander, had assessed supplies in the region and believed they were sufficient; he had not established specifically Russian supply depots in Polish–Lithuanian Commonwealth, which was neutral, but intended to rely on local supply. In 1757, the ongoing support of the 92,000 horses alone required more fodder than was available from any of the friendly territories in Livland, much less unfriendly East Prussia. Furthermore, the Russians had made no effort to expand their supply depots using the Baltic's seaports, which would have been the most obvious way to feed that number of troops at that distance. Finally, the efforts at the troops to requisition supplies were met by a localized guerilla uprising; farmers burnt their crops and destroyed their supplies rather than give to the Russians. Once the Russians reached Livland, observers noted exhausted troops hauling carts because their horses, living on a diet of oak leaves, dropped dead by the hundreds every day.

The Empress was so angry with Apraxin that she removed him from command, and launched an investigation into his actions. She put Alexey Bestuzhev-Ryumin, her chancellor and a friend of Apraxin, on trial for treason. Bestuzhev-Ryumin was later exiled to his estates. Elizabeth appointed William Fermor as the new Russian commander and the next year the invasion was started again. Fermor had an entirely different attitude towards supplying his troops, and developed an extensive network of local supply depots and sources outside of the Russian boundary. This, though, attracted aspersions from his political enemies in St. Petersburg, who claimed he was wasting the imperial treasury; however, Fermor was considerably more successful in 1758 than his predecessor had been in 1757.

== Sources ==
- Anderson, Fred (2007). Crucible of War: The Seven Years' War and the Fate of Empire in British North America, 1754–1766. Knopf Doubleday Publishing Group. ISBN 978-0-307-42539-3.
- Asprey, Robert (2007). Frederick the Great: A Magnificent Enigma. Ticknor & Fields. ISBN 978-0-89919-352-6.
- Berenger, Jean (2014). The Habsburg Empire 1700–1918. Routledge. ISBN 978-1-317-89573-2.
- Black, Jeremy (1990). "Essay and Reflection: On the 'Old System' and the Diplomatic Revolution' of the Eighteenth Century". International History Review. 12 (2): 301–323. doi:10.1080/07075332.1990.9640547.
- Dull, Jonathan R. (2007). The French Navy and the Seven Years' War. University of Nebraska Press. ISBN 9780803205109.
- Horn, D. B. (1957). Lindsay, J.O. (ed.). "The Diplomatic Revolution". The New Cambridge Modern History. 7, The Old Regime: 1713–63: 449–64.
- Keep, John (March 1987). "Feeding the Troops: Russian Army Supply Policies during the Seven Years War". Canadian Slavonic Papers. 29 (1). Taylor & Francis: 24–44. doi:10.1080/00085006.1987.11091848. JSTOR 40868698.
- Konstam, A. (1996). Russian Army of the Seven Years War. Osprey Publishing.
- Krattli, Edward (2014). Dowling, Timothy C. (ed.). "Battle of Gross-Jaegersdorf". Russia at War: From the Mongol Conquest to Afghanistan, Chechnya, and Beyond. ABC-CLIO: 334–5. ISBN 9781598849486.
- LeDonne, John P. (11 December 2003). The Grand Strategy of the Russian Empire, 1650–1831. New York: Oxford University Press. doi:10.1093/oso/9780195161007.001.0001. ISBN 978-0-19-516100-7.
- MacDonogh, Giles (2001). Frederick the Great: A Life in Deed and Letters. New York: St. Martin's Griffin. ISBN 0-312-27266-9.
- Oliphant, John (2016). A/AS Level History for AQA Russia in the Age of Absolutism and Enlightenment. Cambridge University Press. ISBN 9781316504352.
- Poten, Bernhard von (2025) [1883]. Lehwaldt, Hans von . Allgemeine Deutsche Biographie (in German). Vol. 18. Historische Kommission bei der Bayerischen Akademie der Wissenschaften. pp. 166–167 – via Wikisource.
- Scott, Hamish (2014). The Birth of a Great Power System, 1740–1815. Routledge. ISBN 9781317893547.
- Simms, Brendan (2013). Europe: The Struggle for Supremacy, 1453–present. Basic Books. ISBN 978-0-465-06595-0.
- Szabo, Franz J. (2013). The Seven Years War in Europe: 1756–1763. Routledge. ISBN 978-1-317-88697-6.
- Tucker, Spencer C. (23 December 2009). A Global Chronology of Conflict: From the Ancient World to the Modern Middle East. ABC-CLIO.
- Tuttle, Herbert (1899). History of Prussia: Under Frederic the Great, 1740–1757. Houghton, Mifflin.
- Wilson, Peter H. (2016). The Heart of Europe: A History of the Holy Roman Empire. Penguin. pp. 478–479. ISBN 978-0-674-05809-5.
