= Apraksin =

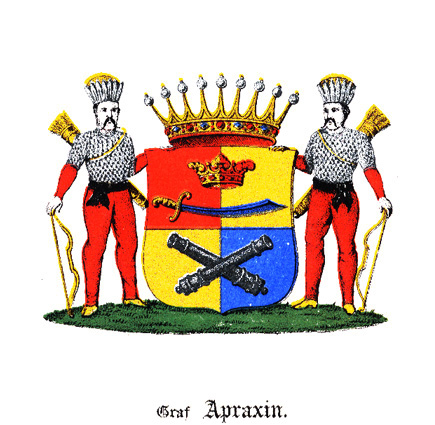
- Coat of arms of Counts Apraksin

Origin
- Region of origin: Russia

The Apraksin family is an ancient Russian noble family, first mentioned in the 14th century, whose members held significant military positions throughout Russian history. They were awarded with the hereditary title of Count in the Russian Empire on 23 February 1710 by Peter the Great, later confirmed on 7 February 1722.

== Notable members ==
- Fyodor Apraksin (1661–1728), Russian admiral
- Marfa Apraksina (1664–1716), second wife of Tsar Feodor III of Russia
- Stepan Fyodorovich Apraksin (1702–1758), Russian commander during the Seven Years' War
- Stepan Stepanovich Apraksin (1747–1827), Russian commander during the Napoleonic Wars
- Tatyana Apraksina, Russian artist and writer

== See also ==
- Apraksin Dvor
- Apraksin, Leningrad Oblast, a settlement in Russia
