= Battle of Zorndorf =

1758 battle of the Third Silesian War and Seven Years' War

- Part of the Third Silesian War and Seven Years' War
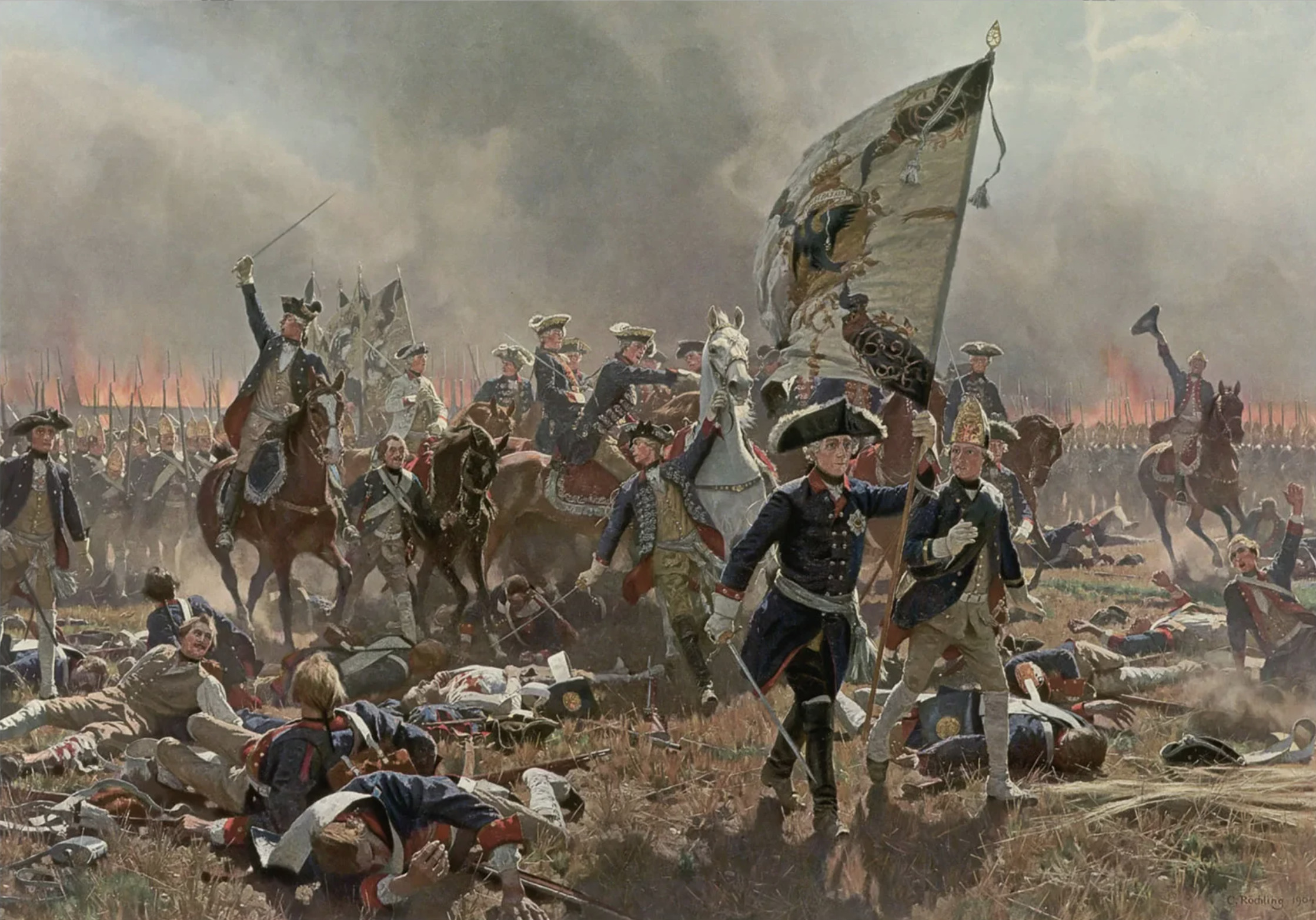
- 1904 illustration of the battle
Date	25 August 1758 (Note: O.S. 14 August)
Location	Zorndorf, Margraviate of Brandenburg (now Sarbinowo, West Pomeranian Voivodeship, Poland) 52°40′19″N 14°39′16″E
Result	Inconclusive

Belligerents
Prussia	Russia

Commanders and leaders
(Kingdom of Prussia) Frederick II	(Russian Empire) William Fermor

Strength
33,000 – 36,000; 167 guns	42,590 – 52,000; 210 guns

Casualties and losses
11,390 – 12,800; 3,680 killed; 7,710 wounded or missing; 1,500 missing (including 1,200 captured); 26 guns 10 standards	16,000 – 17,000; 4,278 killed or captured; 11,867 wounded; 30 guns 11 – 27 standards

Frederick the Great
current battle
First Silesian War
Second Silesian War
Third Silesian War

The Battle of Zorndorf, (Note: Russian: Цорндорфское сражение, romanized: Tsorndorfskoe srajenie; German: Schlacht von Zorndorf) during the Seven Years' War, was fought on 25 August 1758 between Russian troops commanded by Count William Fermor and a Prussian army commanded by King Frederick the Great. The battle was tactically inconclusive, with both armies holding their ground and claiming victory. The site of the battle was the Prussian village of Zorndorf (now Sarbinowo, Poland). During the battle, Frederick famously took a regimental standard and led an attack himself, rallying his troops.

== Seven Years' War ==
Although the Seven Years' War was a global conflict, it was particularly intense in the European theater based on the recently concluded War of the Austrian Succession (1740–1748). The 1748 Treaty of Aix-la-Chapelle gave Frederick II of Prussia, known as Frederick the Great, the prosperous province of Silesia as a consequence of the First and Second Silesian Wars. Empress Maria Theresa of Austria had signed the treaty to gain time to rebuild her military forces and forge new alliances; she was intent upon regaining ascendancy in the Holy Roman Empire as well as the Silesian province. In 1754, escalating tensions with Britain in North America offered France an opportunity to break the British dominance of Atlantic trade. Seeing the opportunity to regain her lost territories and to limit Prussia's growing power, Austria put aside the old rivalry with France to form a new coalition. Faced with this turn of events, Britain aligned herself with the Kingdom of Prussia; this alliance drew in not only the British king's territories held in personal union, including Hanover but also those of his relatives in the Electorate of Hanover and the Landgraviate of Hesse-Kassel. This series of political maneuvers became known as the Diplomatic Revolution.

At the outset of the war, Frederick had one of the finest armies in Europe: his troops—any company—could fire at least four volleys a minute, and some of them could fire five. By the end of 1757, the course of the war had gone well for Prussia, and poorly for Austria. Prussia had achieved spectacular victories at Rossbach and Leuthen, and reconquered parts of Silesia that had fallen back to Austria. The Prussians then pressed south into Austrian Moravia. In April 1758, Prussia and Britain concluded the Anglo-Prussian Convention in which the British committed to pay Frederick an annual subsidy of £670,000. Britain also dispatched 7,000–9,000 troops (Note: Anderson says 7,000, p. 301. Szabo says 9,000.) to reinforce the army of Frederick's brother-in-law, the Duke Ferdinand of Brunswick-Wolfenbüttel. Ferdinand evicted the French from Hanover and Westphalia and re-captured the port of Emden in March 1758; he crossed the Rhine, causing general alarm in France. Despite Ferdinand's victory over the French at the Battle of Krefeld and the brief occupation of Düsseldorf, successful maneuvering of larger French forces required him to withdraw across the Rhine.

After the Battle of Kolín, having pushed the Prussians out of Bohemia in the summer of 1757, and the cleverly waged campaign in the autumn that saw Lieutenant-General the Duke of Bevern's Prussians defeated at the Battle of Breslau (22 November 1757), Empress Maria Theresa of Austria believed her fortunes were taking a turn for the better; however, the situation soon changed when Frederick defeated, first, the French at Rossbach and, then, the Austrians at Leuthen. In August 1758, Austria's ally Russia invaded East Prussia. 42,590 troops under William Fermor advanced within 100 km (62 mi) of Berlin, and were poised to join the Austrians under Field Marshal Daun. King Frederick understood that the joining of his enemies would spell the fall of Berlin and, deciding to forestall their plans, moved to the Russian rear. Fermor, who was then besieging Küstrin, learned about this maneuver from a Cossack sortie. He lifted the siege and occupied a position at Zorndorf, 10 km (6 mi) northeast of Küstrin. At the Battle of Tornow a month later, a Swedish army repulsed the Prussian army but did not move on Berlin. By late summer, fighting had reached a draw. None of Prussia's enemies seemed willing to take the decisive steps to pursue Frederick into Prussia's heartland.

While Ferdinand kept the French occupied in the Rhineland, Prussia had to contend with Sweden, Russia, and Austria. There remained a possibility that Prussia could lose Silesia to Austria, Pomerania to Sweden, Magdeburg to Saxony, and East Prussia to Poland-Lithuania or Russia: for Prussia, this represented an entirely nightmarish scenario. By 1758, Frederick was concerned by the Russian advance from the east and marched to counter it. East of the Oder river in Brandenburg-Neumark, a Prussian army of 36,000 men fought a Russian army of 42,590 at Zorndorf on 25 August 1758.

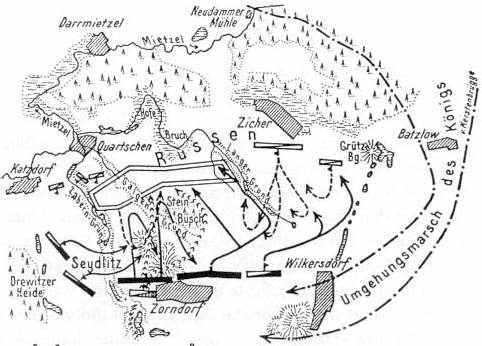
The Battlefield was a morass of marshlands and streams, making passage and tactics difficult

== Terrain ==
Zorndorf is a sizeable hamlet in a peat wilderness, full of scraggy firs, heaths, and cultivated spaces resembling light green islands in a mass of dark fir. In the mid-18th century, it was very marshy, full of bogs; eventually Prussians developed a firm broad road, but this was not even dreamed of in 1758, when it was characterized by bog pools and a semi island some 5–6 mi (8–10 km) from the Oder river, and about 50 ft (15 m) above the river. Thomas Carlyle, who toured the ground 100 years later, investigated some of the old records: he called these marshes "leakages" approximately 2–3 miles broad, mostly bottomless and woven with sluggish creeks and stagnant pools. Zorndorf lies at the crown of this morass of nearly impassable terrain.

== Battle ==
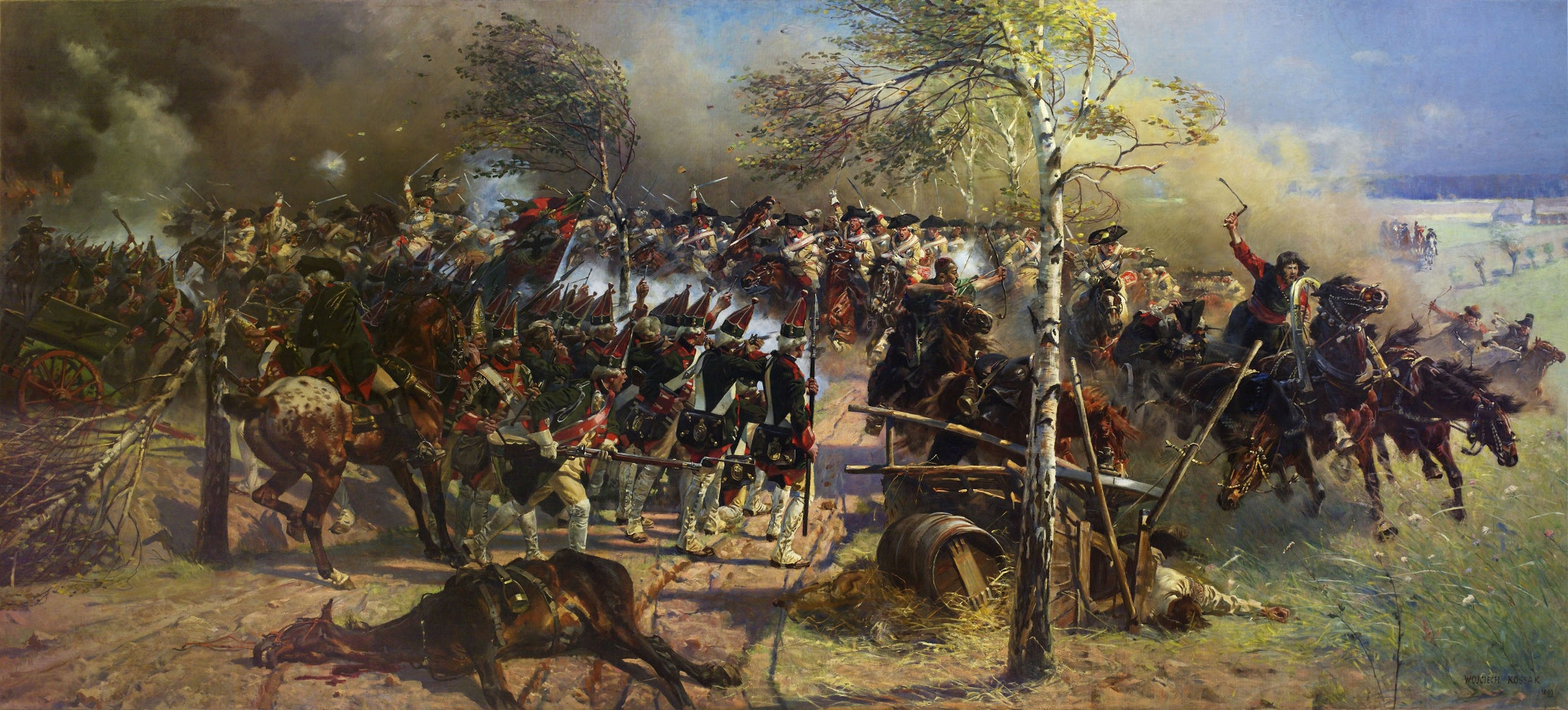
Painting depicting the Battle of Zorndorf, by Wojciech Kossak, 1899

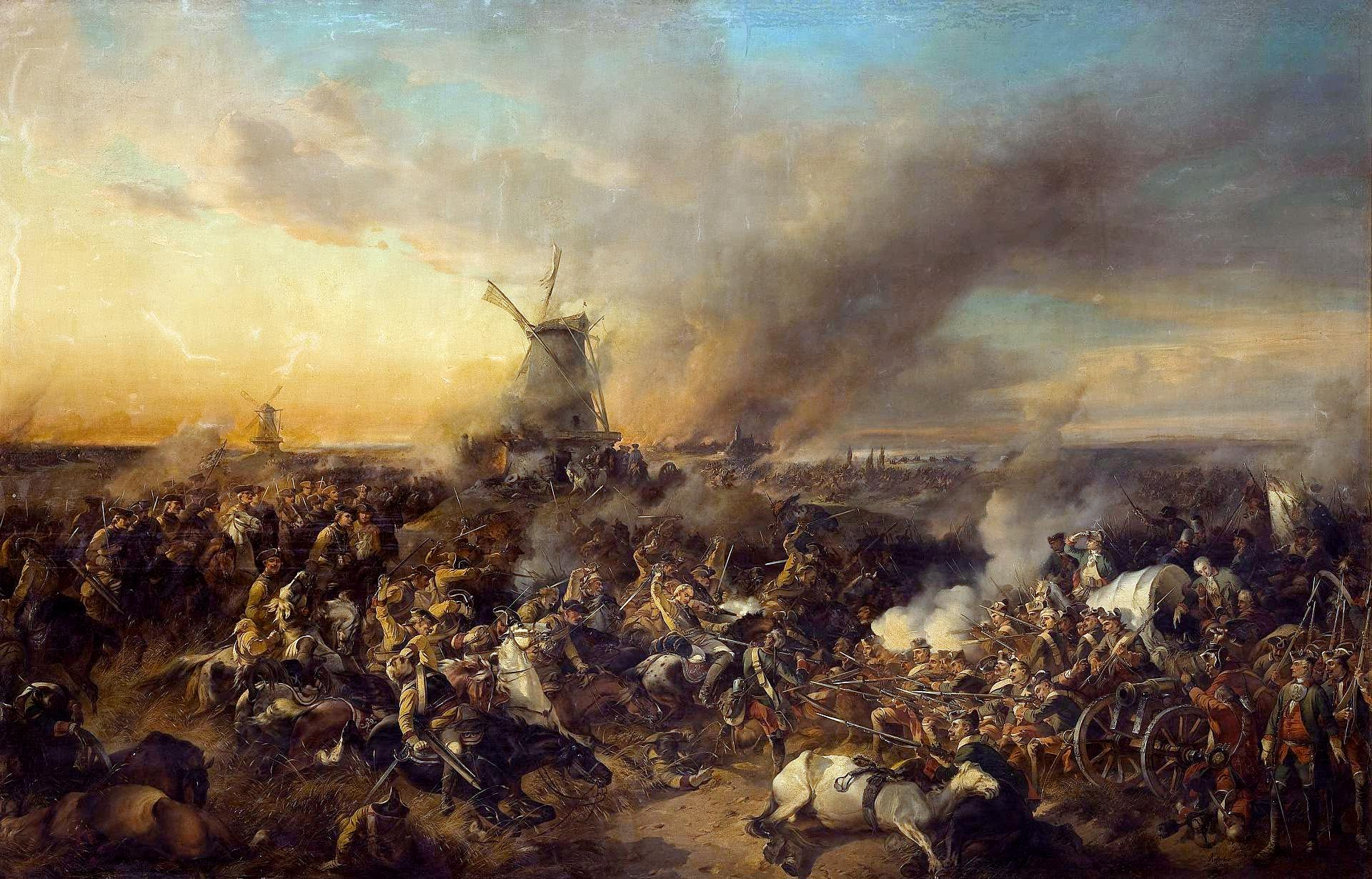
Painting depicting the Battle of Zorndorf, by Alexander Kotzebue, 1852

On 25 August Frederick's infantry attacked a Russian "Observation Corps," which consisted of young conscripts only. The Russians managed to hold their own until the famed cavalry of Friedrich Wilhelm von Seydlitz struck against them. The Russian cavalry clashed with the Prussians, but was routed and had to flee towards the lines of the Russian infantrymen who, confused by clouds of dust and gun smoke, mistook them for the Prussians and opened artillery fire.

In the meantime, Frederick's infantry fell upon the left wing of the Russian army. Frederick intended to repeat the oblique order assault that had granted him victory at the Battle of Leuthen, yet as the Russian lines were unable to retreat due to the swamps in their rear, and the left flank of Frederick's army was likewise unable to enclose the Russian lines because of the unfavorable terrain and successful Russian resistance, the battle took the course of an extremely bloody, frontal clash of the adversaries' armies within a narrow battlefield setting.

During the ensuing battle, both sides quickly ran out of gunpowder and engaged in hand-to-hand fighting. When some of the Prussian battalions showed signs of tiring, Frederick himself led them in an attack. The battle was described by contemporaries as the bloodiest in the 18th century. One Prussian officer reported that "bodies of Russians covered the field row by row; they kissed their cannons while their bodies were cut to pieces by our sabers, but still they would not retreat." After the battle, Frederick famously declared that "it's easier to kill the Russians than to win over them."

== Aftermath ==
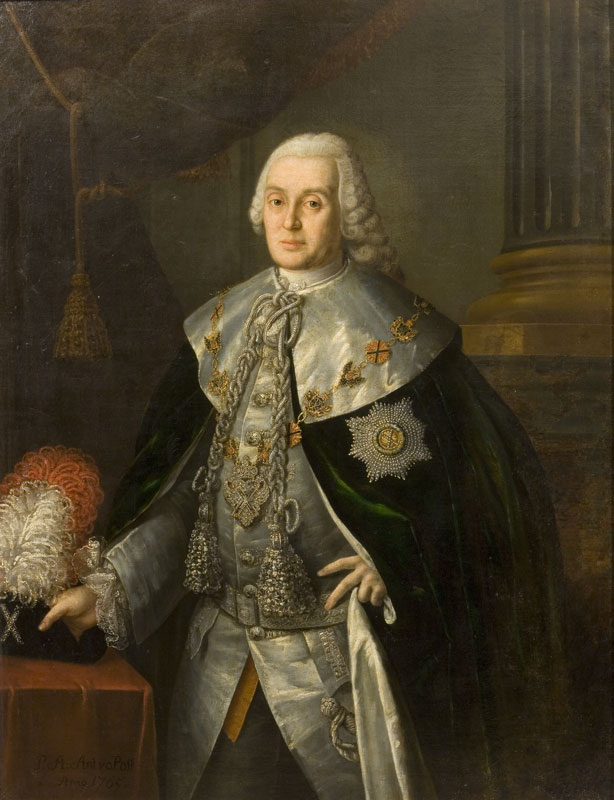
William Fermor, the Russian commander at the battle

The Prussians took 11,390 casualties and immediately claimed that the Russians numbered 70,000 men and lost between 20,000 and 22,000 in total. Two days later they claimed to have defeated 80,000 men and killed 26,000; eventually, this inflated number rose to 30,000 dead in a letter of Frederick to his sister. The actual Russian losses were about 16,000 men, still a significant number. That the Russians took such heavy casualties and did not pull back, left an imprint on the Prussian soldiers and upon Frederick himself. Before the battle he regarded the Russian army as weaker than his own, but in this battle the Russians proved themselves tough opponents and Frederick was frustrated by their tenacity. The battle appeared inconclusive: since neither side was driven from the battlefield, both could declare themselves victorious. However, Fermor, unlike Frederick, did not report his possible "victory," he admitted that he had suffered heavy losses and retreated in order after the end of the battle.

The Russians had no choice but to leave the region; the heavy extractions they had exacted on the countryside meant there was nothing to keep man or beast alive. The Prussians still had their supplies, but otherwise were in the same position as the Russians. Nonetheless, Frederick ended the battle in possession of the terrain, with his lines of communication intact, and his fighting force mobile. The Russians also had disputes with the Austrians. The envoy from Vienna, while in the Russian camp, cast doubts upon Fermor's competence. Fermor responded with detraction on the Austrians' abilities, who had not sent even an auxiliary corps to his assistance. The Austrians were, instead, preparing for a thrust into Saxony against the weaker army Frederick had left behind under the command of his younger brother, Prince Henry. The Austrians advanced so slowly, Henry and his army were gone when the Austrians arrived; and all they managed to achieve during Frederick's absence was to capture a minor Prussian fortress and a garrison of 1,400. Even that feat was a modest one, and achieved by Imperial (Reichsarmee) troops, not Austrian ones.

After the fighting, Frederick withdrew his cavalry to stop their incessant and destructive skirmishing with the Cossacks, thereby allowing the Russian army to re-establish contact with their baggage wagons. Fermor sent a letter to Saint Petersburg, assembled his troops into two columns and marched towards Landsberg to link up with the forces of Count Pyotr Rumyantsev. Upon hearing the news of the battle, three Allied capitals, Saint Petersburg, Vienna and Paris, celebrated a triumph. In fact, Fermor's statement reported that he had lost the opportunity to "take a decisive victory in battle and suffered heavy losses." As Fermor left, Frederick was eager to proclaim it a retreat, although in reality the Russians were not fleeing and marched in perfect order, not being harried by the remaining Prussian troops. The Prussians followed them but refrained from launching another attack. This retreat prevented the Russians from reaching their Austrian allies and allowed Frederick to claim the battle as his victory, a view also popular in 19th century historiography, but historians still disputed the outcome.

== In culture ==
Carl Röchling's 1904 depiction, Frederick the Great in the Battle of Zorndorf Before the Frontline of the von Bülow Regiment, became a widely perceived symbol of the early 20th century ideal of soldiers' heroism.

== Sources ==
- Anderson, Fred (2007). Crucible of War: The Seven Years' War and the Fate of Empire in British North America, 1754–1766. Knopf Doubleday Publishing Group.
- Asprey, Robert (2007). Frederick the Great: A Magnificent Enigma. Ticknor & Fields.
- Black, Jeremy (1990). "Essay and Reflection: On the 'Old System' and the Diplomatic Revolution' of the Eighteenth Century". International History Review. 12 (2): 301–323. doi:10.1080/07075332.1990.9640547. JSTOR 40106181. (registration required)}
- Black, Jeremy (2002). European Warfare, 1660–1815. London: Routledge. ISBN 9780203499429. OCLC 437250436.
- Blanning, Tim (2015). Frederick the Great: King of Prussia. Penguin.
- Berenger, Jean (2014). The Habsburg Empire 1700–1918. Routledge.
- Carlyle, Thomas (1888). Carlyle's Complete Works, Vol. 7: Friedrich II of Prussia called Frederick the Great. Estes and Lauriat.
- Duffy, Christopher (2015). Frederick the Great: A Military Life. Routledge.
- Füssel, Marian (2010). Der Siebenjährige Krieg. Ein Weltkrieg im 18. Jahrhundert. Beck Wissen. München: Beck.
- Hook, A. (2003). Zorndorf 1758: Frederick Faces Holy Mother Russia. Osprey Publishing.
- Horn, D. B. (1957). "The Diplomatic Revolution". In Lindsay, J.O. (ed.). The New Cambridge Modern History. Vol. 7: The Old Regime, 1713–1763. Cambridge University Press. pp. 440–464.
- Jarymowycz, R. J. (2008). Cavalry from Hoof to Track. Greenwood Publishing Group.
  - Kugler, Franz Theodor (1845) [1840]. History of Frederick the Great: Comprehending a Complete History of the Silesian Campaigns and the Seven Years' War. Translated by Moriarty, Edward Aubrey. Illustrated by Menzel, Adolph. London: Henry G. Bohn.
- Kunisch, Johannes (2011). Friedrich der Grosse. Der König und seine Zeit. Beck.
- Macaulay, Thomas Babington (1882). The Life of Frederick the Great. Useful Knowledge Publishing.
- MacDonogh, Giles (1999). Frederick The Great: A Life in Deeds and Letters. St. Martin's Griffin.
- Redman, H. (2015). Frederick the Great and the Seven Years' War, 1756–1763. Jefferson, North Carolina: McFarland. ISBN 978-1-4766-1300-0.
- Robson, Eric (1957). "The Seven Years War". In Lindsay, J.O. (ed.). The New Cambridge Modern History. Vol. 7: The Old Regime, 1713–1763. Cambridge University Press. pp. 465–486.
- Scott, H. M. (2001). The Emergence of the Eastern Powers, 1756–1775. Cambridge University Press.
- Simms, Brendan (2013). Europe: The Struggle for Supremacy, 1453–present. Basic Books. ISBN 978-0465065950.
- Schottmüller, Adolf (1858). Die Schlacht bei Zorndorf: Eine Jubelschrift Mit 1 Schlachtplan (in German). Friedrich Schultze.
- Szabo, Franz (2013). The Seven Years War in Europe: 1756–1763. Routledge.
- Wilson, Peter H. (2016). The Heart of Europe: A History of the Holy Roman Empire. Penguin.
- Zabecki, D. T. (2014). Germany at War: 400 Years of Military History. ABC-CLIO.
