= James Douglas McLachlan =

Major-General James Douglas McLachlan CB CMG DSO
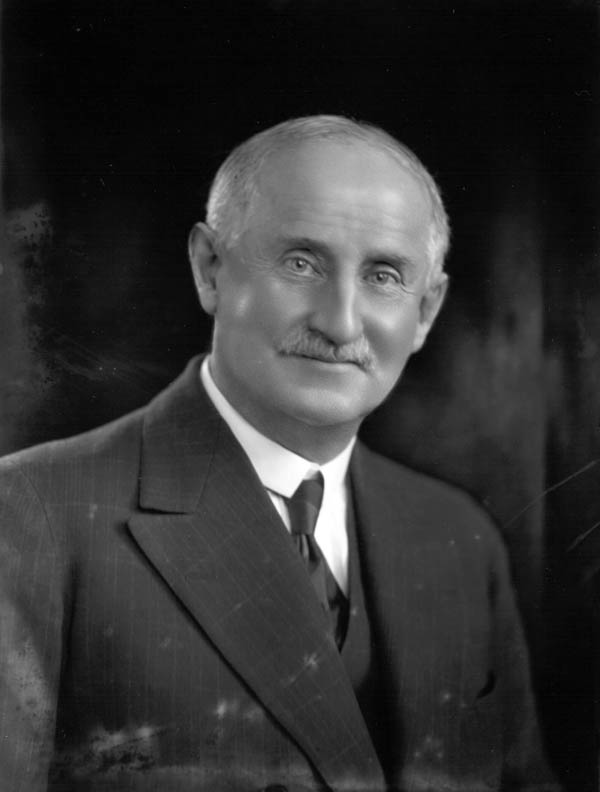
- James Douglas McLachlan, photographed on 26 October 1927
- Born: 14 February 1869; Semarang, Java
- Died: 7 November 1937 (aged 68); London, England
- Children: J. O. Lindsay
- Military career
- Allegiance: United Kingdom
- Branch: British Army
- Service years: 1891–
- Rank: Temporary: Major-General; Substantive: Colonel
- Unit: Queen's Own Cameron Highlanders
- Commands: 1st Battalion Cameron Highlanders; 8th Infantry Brigade
- Conflicts: Mahdist War: Nile Expedition; Siege of Khartoum; First World War
- Awards: Companion of the Order of the Bath; Companion of the Order of St Michael and St George; Distinguished Service Order; Mentioned in dispatches x 2 Distinguished Service Medal (United States); Officer of the Legion of Honour (France)

James Douglas McLachlan CB CMG DSO (14 February 1869 – 7 November 1937) was the first British wartime Military attaché to Washington, D.C.

== Military career ==
James Douglas McLachlan was born in Semarang, Java, on 14 February 1869. After graduating from the Royal Military College, Sandhurst, he was commissioned into the Queen's Own Cameron Highlanders in 1891. He participated in the Nile Expedition in 1898 and, subsequently, at the famous Siege of Khartoum. He married Gwendolen Mab White, of Havilah, New South Wales in 1903 at St Margaret's Church in London.

As lieutenant colonel, McLachlan commanded the 1st Battalion of the Cameron Highlanders in March 1913 and led it to France in the early stages of the World War I until September 1914, when he was wounded. He then commanded 8th Infantry Brigade from October 1915 to March 1916. He was awarded the Distinguished Service Order (June 1916) and mentioned in dispatches twice (January 1916 and June 1916). He was promoted to temporary brigadier general on 26 June 1916 and commanded a brigade. He served on the staff as a brigadier general before being appointed as the first wartime military attaché to the United States; he arrived in the United States with his wife and two school girl daughters on 11 September 1917.

In-post, he was promoted to Major General. He was raised to a Companion of the Order of the Bath on 3 June 1918 and a Companion of the Order of St Michael and St George in June 1919. Upon relinquishing his post as military attaché, McLachlan reverted to his substantive rank of Colonel. He was awarded the United States Distinguished Service Medal in July 1919. McLachlan was also an officer of the French Legion of Honour. He died on 7 November 1937 in London.
