= Hans von Lehwaldt =

Prussian Generalfeldmarschall (1685–1768)

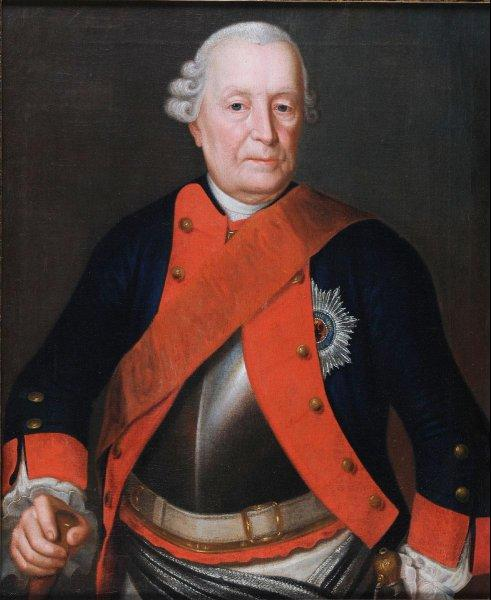
- Portrait by Leonhard Schorer, 1744
- Born: 24 June 1685; Labiau, Prussia
- Died: 16 November 1768 (aged 83); Berlin
- Burial place: Juditten Church; 54°42′57″N 20°25′29″E
- Military career
- Allegiance: (Kingdom of Prussia) Prussia
- Branch: Prussian Army
- Service years: 1700–1765
- Rank: Generalfeldmarschall
- Conflicts: War of the Spanish Succession; Siege of Venlo; Battle of Blenheim; Great Northern War; First Silesian War; Second Silesian War; Seven Years' War; Gross Jägersdorf; Blockade of Stralsund
- Awards: Pour le Mérite (1742); Black Eagle Order (1744); Equestrian statue of Frederick the Great 1851

Hans von Lehwald(t) (24 June 1685 – 16 November 1768), also known as Johann von Lehwald(t), was a Prussian Generalfeldmarschall. He joined the military in 1700 and participated in all Prussian field operations from the War of Spanish Succession through the Seven Years' War. He served with particular distinction in Frederick the Great's war with the Austrians in the Silesia and Seven Years' War.

== Origins ==
Lehwaldt was born in Legitten near Labiau in the Duchy of Prussia. His mother Marie Esther came from an old Prussian family, the Freiherrn von der Trenck.

== Military career ==
In 1699, Lehwaldt began his military service when he entered the battalion "Weiße Grenadier-Garde" (Nr. 18). He participated in the War of the Spanish Succession since 1702 and experienced his trial by fire in the September siege of Venlo. In spring 1704, his battalion fought in the Battle of Blenheim, and Lehwaldt was promoted to Fähnrich on 16 September. From 29 September – 6 October he participated in the siege of Hagenau.

He subsequently participated in the campaign in Pomerania against Sweden in 1715, during the Great Northern War.

=== Activities in War of Austrian Succession ===
At the beginning of Prussia's war with Austria, he was garrisoned with Prince Leopold von Anhalt's army in Brandenburg, and marched with Leopold and Frederick II of Prussia in 1742 to Silesia. There he participated in the Battle of Chotusitz on 17 May. Prussian success at this battle led to the Treaty of Breslau.

In the Second Silesian war he was, first, with General Marwitz in Upper Silesia, and then commanded a special corps against the Austrians on 14 February 1745 at Habelschwerdt. His actions there confirmed Frederick's faith in him. Frederick awarded Lehwaldt the Pour le Mérite in 1742 after the First Silesian War and the Order of the Black Eagle on 4 February 1744.

Lehwaldt was promoted to Generalfeldmarschall on 22 January 1751. Frederick also awarded him a diamond-covered medallion portrait of himself on a blue band. Wilhelm Dietrich von Buddenbrock and Friedrich Wilhelm von Dossow were the only other recipients of the medallion.

=== Seven Years' War ===
As political tensions mounted in 1756, Frederick sent Lehwaldt, who commanded of forces in East Prussia, one hundred officers' patents to fill as he saw fit, expecting him to strengthen the army there. The Russian field marshal Stepan Fyodorovich Apraksin commanded an army of approximately 55,000 men and entered East Prussia in 1756 and captured Memel, which became the army's base for an invasion of the rest of Prussia. Apraksin tried to encircle the Prussians with his larger army, which Lehwaldt was able to avoid; instead, Lehwaldt's 25,000 troops intercepted a corps of Russians commanded by Vasily Loupukhin at Gross Jägersdorf. Loupukhin was killed, and the rest of Apraksin's army came to the aid of the Russians. Lehwaldt lost 4,600 casualties and Apraxin 7,000. Apraxin marched on Königsberg but his troops, lacking in supplies, suffered considerable attrition. Although Lehwaldt withdrew his corps from the battle, the Russians were unable to follow up on the victory. Apraxin retreated from the province after hearing a false report that Empress Elizabeth of Russia had died. Lehwaldt then oversaw the Blockade of Stralsund, keeping Swedish forces pinned down on the Baltic Sea.

Because of his poor health, Lehwaldt was transferred to Berlin, where he became governor of the city in 1759. Lehwaldt and Friedrich Wilhelm von Seydlitz, both invalids by that time, were unable to resist the Allied capture and looting of the relatively defenseless Berlin and Potsdam in October 1760 by 15,000 Austrians and 23,600 Russians. Lehwaldt died in Königsberg in 1768 and was buried in the Juditten Church.

== Bibliography ==
- MacDonogh, Giles (2001). Frederick the Great: A Life in Deed and Letters. New York: St. Martin's Griffin. p. 436. ISBN 0-312-27266-9.
- Joachim Engelmann und Günter Dorn: Friedrich der Große und seine Generale, Friedberg 1988. (in German)
- Bernhard von Poten: Lehwaldt, Hans von. In: Allgemeine Deutsche Biographie (ADB). Bd. 18, S. 166–67. (in German)
