= William Fermor =

Russian general (1702–1777)

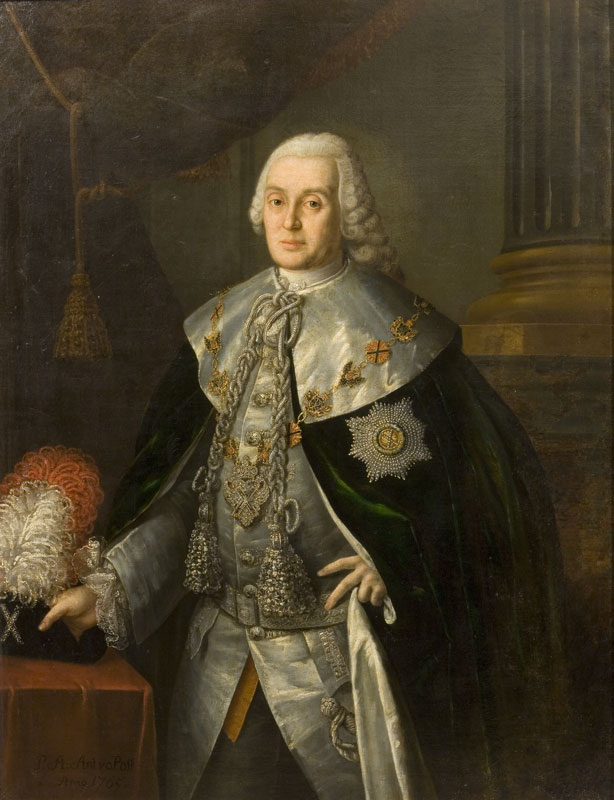
- Portrait by Aleksey Antropov, 1765
- Born: September 28, 1702; Pskov, Russian Empire
- Died: February 8, 1771 (aged 68); Nītaure, Russian Empire
- Other name: Wilhelm von Fermor
- Relatives: Counts Fermor
- Military career
- Allegiance: Russia
- Branch: Imperial Russian Army
- Rank: General-in-chief
- Conflicts: War of the Polish Succession; Siege of Danzig; Seven Years' War; Siege of Memel; Battle of Gross-Jägersdorf; Battle of Zorndorf; Raid on Berlin
- Awards: Order of St. Andrew; Order of Saint Alexander Nevsky; Order of Saint Anna; Order of the White Eagle (Poland)

Count William Fermor (Russian: Виллим Виллимович Фермор, romanized: Villim Villimovich Fermor) was an officer in the Imperial Russian Army best known for leading his country's army at the Battle of Zorndorf during the Seven Years' War. His name is sometimes styled Wilhelm Graf von Fermor.

== Early life ==
Fermor was born in 1702 in Pskov, Russia, of Scottish and Lutheran Baltic German descent. He joined the Russian army in 1720 and distinguished himself at the Siege of Danzig during the War of the Polish Succession. He later saw action against the Ottoman Empire and the Finns. He preferred to associate mostly with other Germans in the service of Russia, something which caused resentment among Russian-speaking officers. He was a protégé of Burkhard Christoph von Münnich.

== Third Silesian War ==
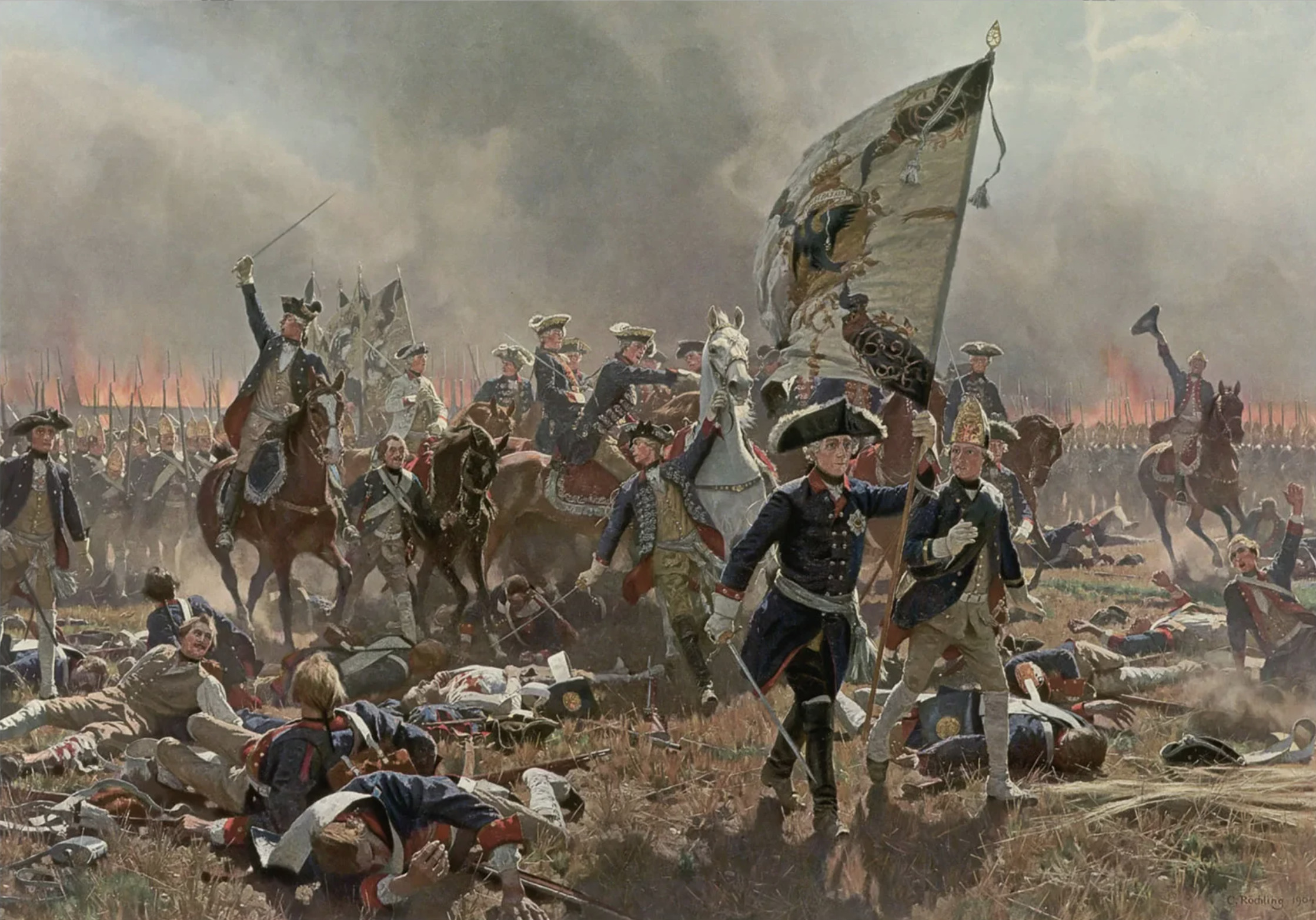
Battle of Zorndorf, 1758

In 1757, Fermor led a Russian force that captured Memel in East Prussia, and was present at the Battle of Gross-Jägersdorf.

In 1758, he was appointed to command the Russian forces which had invaded Prussia during the Seven Years' War. He replaced Stepan Fedorovich Apraksin who had displeased Empress Elizabeth. Fermor reversed the previous commander’s policies towards the civilian population of occupied East Prussia, denouncing the previous hard-line stance, and even having proclamations read apologising for it.

On 25 August 1758, he led his army against Frederick the Great at the Battle of Zorndorf. The battle cost both sides heavy casualties. Afterwards, Fermor withdrew his forces eastwards. He was later relieved of his command and served as a subordinate to Pyotr Saltykov during 1759.

In 1760, he was in overall command of Russian forces during the Raid on Berlin, which saw them and their Austrian allies briefly occupy the Prussian capital before withdrawing.

== Later life ==
Following the coup that brought Catherine II to the throne he was made Governor of Smolensk. He died in 1771.

== Bibliography ==
- "Фермор, Виллим Виллимович" . Brockhaus and Efron Encyclopedic Dictionary (in Russian). 1906.
- Millar, Simon & Hook, Adam. Zorndorf 1758: Frederick Faces Holy Mother Russia. Osprey, 2003.
- Szabo, Franz A.J. The Seven Years War in Europe, 1756-1763. Pearson, 2008.
