= J. O. Lindsay =

British historian (1910–1996)

Jean Olivia Lindsay (née McLachlan; 1910–1996) was a British historian who was the Headmistress of St George's School. She was a graduate of Girton College, Cambridge University.

== Life ==
Jean Olivia Lindsay was born in India, to James Douglas McLachlan and Gwendolyn Mab White. She was educated at schools in Edinburgh and at Queen's College, located on Harley Street in London. Her father was posted as the first British military attache to Washington D.C. and she accompanied him, with her mother and sister Felicita Dina.

She studied history at Girton from 1929–32, obtaining a distinction in Part II of the Tripos. She undertook historical research in Cambridge, London and Spain as a Cairnes Student from 1932 to 1936, leading to her PhD in 1936; she was awarded both the University Prince Consort Prize and Seeley Medal in 1938.

Lindsay had a distinguished war service in the Ministry of Information and in the First Aid Nursing Yeomanry (FANY, renamed FANY (The Princess Royal's Volunteer Corps) in 1999) 1939–45, and she came back to Girton as Lecturer in Modern History and Fellow, later also a University Lecturer. She married Humphrey David Richard Pelham Lindsay in 1947. In 1960, she moved to Edinburgh, where she was Headmistress of St George's School until her retirement in 1976. Jean Lindsay published widely, particularly on the history of Anglo-Spanish relations. In 1957, she was named editor of volume seven of Cambridge's The New Cambridge Modern History. Jean Lindsay published widely, particularly on the history of Anglo-Spanish relations.
