= Memel =

Memel, a name derived from the Couronian-Latvian memelis, mimelis, mēms for "mute, silent", may refer to:

- Memel, East Prussia, Germany, now Klaipėda, Lithuania
  - Memelburg, (Klaipėda Castle), the Ordensburg in Memel, a castle built in 1252 by Teutonic Knights which was the nucleus for the city
  - Memel Territory (Klaipėda Region), (German: Memelland), the area separated from Germany by the Treaty of Versailles, later called Klaipėda Region
  - Battle of Memel (disambiguation)
- Neman (German: Memel), part of a river in East Prussia, Germany, mentioned in the Deutschlandlied (1841) as the eastern border of Germany
- Nemunėlis River (German: Memele, Latvian: Mēmele) in northern Lithuania and southern Latvia
- Memel, Free State, a village in the Free State Province of South Africa
- SS Memel, a German cargo ship in service 1934–1945
- The indigenous name of Goat Island, New South Wales, Australia
