= Lajos Kisfaludy =

Lajos Kisfaludy (30 August 1924 in Gemer, Czechoslovakia − 30 October 1988 in Budapest, Hungary) was a Hungarian chemical engineer, a corresponding member of the Hungarian Academy of Sciences. He is renowned for his research in the field of peptide synthesis and medicinal chemistry.

From 1943, he studied at the Budapest University of Technology and graduated in 1948 as a chemical engineer. Until 1956, he taught at the Department of Organic Chemistry of the university. In 1956, he started to work for the Kőbánya Pharmaceutical Factory in Budapest as director and research professor of the synthesis laboratory, a position that he held from 1958 until his death.

His main research was in the field of medicinal chemistry. He introduced new methods and protecting groups into the process of peptide synthesis. He contributed to the chemical synthesis of human hormones such as oxytocin and adrenocorticotropic hormone. As a result of his experiments, nearly 80 medicines were synthesized and introduced to the market (including Cavinton, Seduxen and Suprastin).

He was a corresponding (1982) member of the Hungarian Academy of Sciences.

== Works ==
- Szerves kémiai laboratóriumi alapműveletek [Fundamentals of organic chemistry in the laboratory] Budapest, Budapesti Műszaki Egyetem, 1950.
