= Stepan Fyodorovich Apraksin =

Russian armies commander during the Seven Years' War (1702–1758)

Stepan Apraksin
- Степан Фёдорович Апраксин
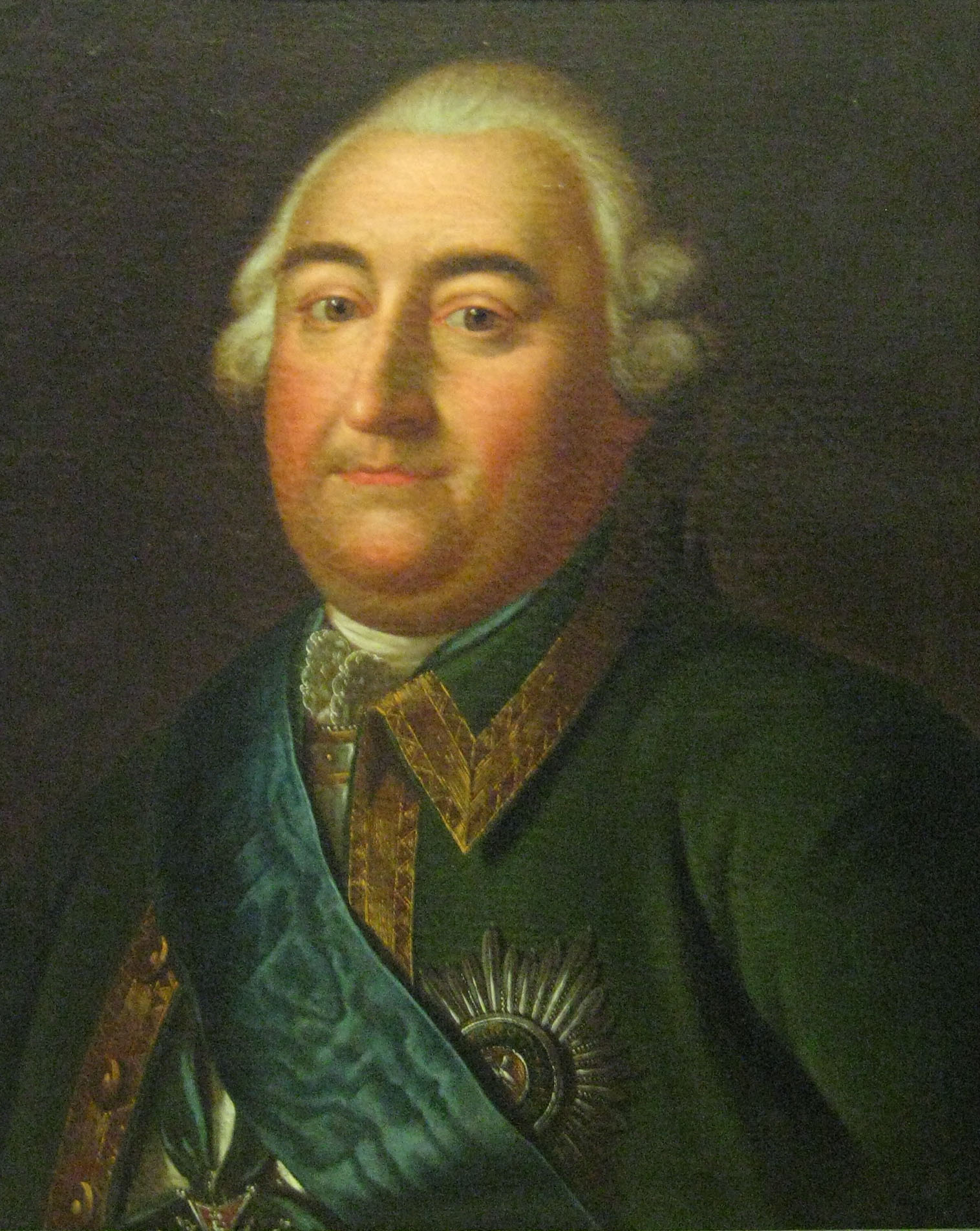
- Born: August 10, 1702
- Died: August 17, 1758 (aged 56)
- Military career
- Branch: Imperial Russian Army
- Rank: Field marshal
- Conflicts: Seven Years' War; Battle of Gross-Jägersdorf

Stepan Fyodorovich Apraksin (Russian: Степан Фёдорович Апраксин; 10 August [O.S. 30 July] 1702 – 17 August [O.S. 6 August] 1758), a relative of Fyodor M. Apraksin, commanded the Russian armies during the Seven Years' War. He should not be confused with his son Stepan Stepanovich Apraksin, who had a notable military career in the service of Catherine the Great.

== Early life ==
Apraksin the Elder fought under Münnich against the Turks and rose rapidly to the rank of General. He was present at the taking of Ochakov in 1737 and brought to the Russian capital news about the capture of Khotin in 1739. Several years later, he led the Russian embassy to Persia.

== Politics ==
At the Russian court Apraksin became one of the keenest opponents of both the pro-Prussian party and of Count Lestocq. He was one of the few devoted supporters of Chancellor Aleksey Bestuzhev, who ensured Apraksin's promotion to Field Marshal and appointment to command the Russian army on the outbreak of the Seven Years' War in 1756.

== Seven Years' War ==
The next year Apraksin took up the overall command of the army invading Prussia and won the Battle of Gross-Jägersdorf on 30 August 1757, albeit with heavy losses. The Russian court, upon receiving news of the victory, expected Apraksin to overrun all of Prussia. Instead, on hearing that Empress Elizabeth had suffered a severe relapse in health, Apraksin crossed the Neman River and returned to Russia, intending to support the heir to the throne (the future Peter III of Russia, who represented the interests of Frederick II of Prussia) in the event of the Empress's death. According to another interpretation, he was recalled by Bestuzhev whose enemies plotted his downfall.

== Downfall ==
As Elizabeth recovered, Bestuzhev fell from power and suffered banishment, and Apraksin came under the suspicion of having received bribes from the Prussian king. Put on trial, he died in prison under mysterious circumstances in August 1758 before the military tribunal had reached a decision as to the reasons for his scandalous retreat. He was replaced as commander in Prussia, by William Fermor who went on to fight the inconclusive Battle of Zorndorf against Frederick the Great.
