= Daniel Marston (historian) =

American historian

Daniel Marston is the Director of the Secretary of Defense Strategic Thinkers Program (STP) and Professor of the Practice at the Paul H. Nitze School of Advanced International Studies (SAIS) at the Johns Hopkins University. Previously 2012 to 2018 he was a professor in Military Studies in the Strategic and Defence Studies Centre at the Australian National University and Principal of the Military and Defense Studies Program at the Australian Command and Staff College.

Daniel Marston was born and raised in Boston, Massachusetts. He completed his doctorate in the history of war at Balliol College, Oxford University, under the supervision of Professor Robert O’Neil. He previously held the Ike Skelton Distinguished Chair of the Art of War at the US Army Command and General Staff College. He has been a visiting fellow, on multiple occasions, with the Leverhulme Changing Character of War Program at the University of Oxford. He was previously a Senior Lecturer in War Studies at the Royal Military Academy Sandhurst. He has been working with the US, USMC, and British Army in Iraq and Afghanistan since 2006. His research focuses on the topic of how armies learn and reform.

Marston's first book Phoenix from the Ashes, an in-depth assessment of how the British/Indian Army turned defeat into victory in the Burma campaign of the Second World War, won the Field Marshal Templer Medal Book Prize in 2003.

== Bibliography ==
Daniel Marston's publications include:

- Marston, D 2016, 'Learning and adapting for jungle warfare, 1942-45: The Australian and British Indian Armies', in P.J. Dean (ed.), Australia 1944-45: Victory in the Pacific, Cambridge University Press, Port Melbourne, Australia, pp. 121–144.
- Marston, D 2015, 'The 20th Indian Division in French Indo-China, 1945-46: Combined/ joint Operations and the fog of war, NIDS International Forum on War History 2015, National Institute for Defense Studies, Tokyo.
- Marston, D & Malkasian, C (eds.) 2 eds, 2008 and 2010, Counterinsurgency in Modern Warfare, Osprey Publishing Ltd, UK.
