= Battles of the Seven Years' War =

The Seven Years' War, 1754–1763, spanned four continents, affecting Europe, the Americas, West Africa, and India and the Philippines, in Asia.

The conflict split Europe into two coalitions: Kingdom of Great Britain, Prussia, Portugal, Hanover, and other small German states on one side versus the Kingdom of France, Austria-led Holy Roman Empire, Russia, Spain, several small German states, and Sweden on the other. The coalitions represented a "revolution" in diplomatic alliances, reflected in the Diplomatic Revolution. Ultimately, the victory of the Anglo-Prussian coalition undercut the balance of power in Europe, a balance that was not reestablished until 1815.

== Situation ==
Although Anglo-French skirmishes over their American colonies had already begun in 1754, the seven year long large-scale war that drew in most of the European powers was centered on Austria's desire to recover Silesia, which it had lost in 1747 to Prussia under Frederick the Great's takeover. In India, the Mughal Empire, with the encouragement of the French, tried to crush a British attempt to conquer Bengal: these are known as the Third Carnatic War.

In the European theater, seeing the opportunity to curtail Britain's and Prussia's ever-growing power, France and Austria put aside their ancient rivalry to form a coalition of their own. Britain faced with this sudden turn of events aligned herself with Prussia This alliance drew in not only the British king's territories in personal union by marriage, including Hanover, but also those of his relatives in the Electorate of Brunswick-Lüneburg and the Landgraviate of Hesse-Kassel. This series of political maneuvers became known as the Diplomatic Revolution.

In the Americas, the same coalitions prevailed but each side added a First Nation "Indian" partner. The Abenaki, an Algonquin speaking tribe, joined with the French. The Haudenosaunee, or Five Nations, joined with the British. To both sides, the war in North America particularly proved expensive. The Haudenosaunee, who lived predominantly in lands controlled by the French, wrought havoc on the European trade routes and settlements of France. The Abenaki, who were also known as "People of the Dawn", lived in, or had been displaced by, English settlers in the Atlantic colonies, thus they antagonized British trade and activities. In the West Indies, the British and Spanish fought for control of key points in the Caribbean trade routes, particularly the Windward Passage and Havana. In West Africa, the British effort was to oust France from its colonies in Gorée, Senegal, and Gambia.

After seven years of exhaustive and expensive fighting (nine in North America), the Anglo-Prussian coalition prevailed. The war marked the rise of Britain as the world's predominant power; it also destroyed France's land supremacy in Europe, and Prussia, due to Frederick the Great's military prowess, established itself as a dominant land-power in Europe. The Austrian Habsburgs lost permanently their territories in Silesia to Prussia. This altered the European balance of power.

Theater	Abbreviation	Location
Baltic	BAL	Area bordering on the Baltic sea, principally disputed between Sweden, Denmark, Russia, Poland-Lithuania and Prussia
Hereditary Habsburg lands	HHL	Lands previously part of the Habsburg inheritance but lost to Prussia in the War of Austrian Succession
French-British coast	FBC	Attempted invasions of France and Britain, and naval battles in the coastal areas.
Central Europe	CE	Portions of the Holy Roman Empire upon which combat occurred (such as Saxony, Prussia, Hannover)
Rhineland	RH	Western portions of the Holy Roman Empire under contest.
North America	NA	British colonies in North America, unsettled lands to the Mississippi River, and portions of Canada
Iberia	IB	Predominantly coastal cities and fortresses in Portugal, Spain, and Malta.
West Africa	WA	French forts on the coast of Senegal
Indian Subcontinent	IS	India, Bengal, Carnatic, and Indian Ocean battles, fought between French and British East India Company

== Battles ==
Name	Theater	Date	Year	Combatant	Combatant2	State/Location of Action	Outcome
Siege of Pirna	CE	11 September – 14 October	1756	Prussia	Saxony; Austria	Saxony	Siege and blockage of Saxon army began in early September and ended with surrender of the Saxon Army on 14 October to Hans Karl von Winterfeldt
Battle of Lobositz	CE	1 October	1756	Prussia	Austria	Saxony	Prussian tactical victory; Austrian strategic victory. Prussians won the battle but Austrians forced them to retreat.
Battle of Reichenberg	CE	20 April	1757	Prussia	Austria	Saxony	Prussian victory
Battle of Prague (1757)	HHL	5 May	1757	Prussia	Austria	Saxony	Prussian victory
Battle of Prague (1757) (conclusion)	HHL	20 June	1757	Prussia	Austria	Saxony	
Battle of Kolín	HHL	18 June	1757	Prussia	Austria	Bohemia	Austrian victory; Frederick's first defeat in this war forced him to abandon a march on Vienna, raise his siege of Prague, and fall back on Litoměřice/Leitmeritz.
Battle of Hastenbeck	RH	26 July	1757	Hanover; Britain; Hesse-Cassel; Brunswick	France	Hanover	French victory; Convention of Klosterzeven signed and Hanover occupied by France; treaty later dismissed after Prussian victory at Rossbach; French withdraw from Hanover in early 1758
Battle of Rossbach	HRE	5 November	1757	Prussia	France; Austria	Saxony-Anhalt	Prussian victory over the largely French army
Battle of Leuthen	HHL	5 December	1757	Prussia	Austria	Silesia	Prussian victory; Frederick uses the oblique order masterfully to defeat the larger Austrian army
Siege of Olomouc (start)	HHL	1 May	1758	Prussia	Austria	Bohemia	Austrian victory
Siege of Olomouc (conclusion)	HHL	2 July	1758	Prussia	Austria	Bohemia	Austrian victory
Battle of Domstadtl	HHL	30 June	1758	Prussia	Austria	Bohemia	Austrian victory
Capture of Senegal	WA	April-May	1758	BritainLocal Wolof Militias	France	Saint-Louis, Senegal	British victory.; British successfully convince the local Wolof people to take up arms against the French. - French garrison of Fort Saint Louis taken by surprise.; French administrators surrendered the colony to the British forces. - the capture of the colony cut off several major French trade routs and did significant damage to the French slave and gum industries
Battle of Rheinberg	RH	12 June	1758	Hanover; Britain; Hesse-Cassel; Brunswick	France	Hanover	
Battle of Krefeld	RH	23 June	1758	Great Britain; Hesse-Cassel; Brunswick; Hanover	France	North Rhine-Westphalia	
Battle of Zorndorf	HHL	25 August	1758	Prussia	Russia	Brandenburg	
1st Battle of Lutterberg	RH	10 October	1758	Britain; Hanover	France	Saxony	
Battle of Hochkirch	HHL	14 October	1758	Prussia	Austria	Silesia	
Prussian Bohemia Incursion	HHL	14–20 April	1759	Prussia	Austria	Bohemia	Six-day raid into Bohemia by Prussia to destroy Austrian magazines and disrupt troop movements. Austrian summer campaign delayed.
Siege of Masulipatam	IS	6 March–7 April	1759	British East India Company	French East India Company	Masulipatam	British victory; siege ended when British stormed the town
Battle of Minden	RH	1 August	1759	Britain; Hesse-Cassel; Brunswick; Hanover; Schaum-Lippe,	Saxony; France	formerly West Prussia, now North Rhine-Westphalia	
Battle of Kay	HHL	23 July	1759	Prussia	Russia	Brandenburg	
Battle of Bergen (1759)	RH	13 April	1759	Great Britain; Hesse-Cassel; Brunswick; Hanover	France	Near Frankfurt	
Battle of Pondicherry	IS	10 September	1759	Britain	France	Off the cost of Pondicherry	Strategically indecisive.; Tactical French victory.
Battle of Hoyerswerda	HHL	25 September	1759	Prussia	Austria	Hoyerswerda, Saxony	Prussian victory
Battle of Maxen	HHL	20 November	1759	Prussia	Austria	Maxen, Electorate of Saxony	Austrian victory
Battle of Meissen	HHL	4 December	1759	Prussia	Austria	Saxony	
Battle of Corbach	RH	10 July	1760	Britain; Hanover; Prussia; Hesse-Cassel	France	Hesse Cassel	
Battle of Emsdorf	RH	14 July	1760	Britain; Hanover	France	Hesse	
Siege of Dresden		22 July	1760	Prussia	Saxony; Austria	Saxony	
Battle of Warburg	RH	31 July	1760	Britain; Hanover	France; Saxony	Hesse	
Battle of Kloster Kampen	RH	15 October	1760	Britain; Brunswick; Prussia; Hanover	France	North Rhine Westphalia	
Battle of Torgau	HHL	3 November	1760	Prussia	Austria	Saxony	
Battle of Langensalza (1761)	HHL	10 February	1761	Prussia; Britain	France; Saxony	Thuringia	
Siege of Cassel (1761)	RH	30 April	1761	Brunswick	France	Hesse-Cassel	
Battle of Grünberg	RH	21 March	1761	Hanover; Hesse-Cassel; Brunswick	France	Hesse-Cassel	
Battle of Villinghausen	RH	16 July	1761	Prussia; Hanover; Great Britain	France	Hesse Cassel	
Battle of Röpenack	BAL	6 August	1761	Prussia	Sweden	Siedenbollentin, Mecklenburg-Vorpommern	A minor Swedish force halt the Prussian forces advance into Pomerania
Battle of Cape Finisterre		13-14 August	1761	Britain	France	Naval action off the coast of Cape Finisterre	British victory; French ship of the line Courageux captured
Battle of Ölper (1761)	RH	13 October	1761	Brunswick	France; Saxony	Duchy of Brunswick	
Battle of Wilhelmsthal	RH	24 June	1762	Brunswick; Britain; Hesse Cassel	France	Castle of Wilhelmsthal near Calden, northwestern Germany	
2nd Battle of Lutterberg	HRE	19 July	1762	Britain; Brunswick; Hanover	Franceybr />Saxony	Lower Saxony	
Battle of Nauheim	RH	30 August	1762	Hesse Cassel; Hanover; Britain	France	Hesse Cassel	
Battle of Freiberg	HRE	29 October	1762	Prussia	Austria	Saxony	
2nd Siege of Cassel	RH	30 November	1762	Britain; Hanover; Hesse-Cassel	France	Hesse-Cassel	
Battle of Kunersdorf	HRE	12 August	1759	Prussia	Russia; Austria	Brandenburg	Russian and Austrian victory
Battle of Moys	HHL	7 September	1757	Prussia	Austria	Upper Lusatia	
Battle of Breslau	HHL	22 November	1757	Prussia	Austria	Silesia	Austrian victory; forced Frederick to return to Breslau.
Battle of Leuthen	HHL	5 December	1757	Prussia	Austria	Silesia	Decisive Prussian victory over Austrian army
Siege of Breslaue	HHL	19 December	1757	Prussia	Austria; France	Silesia	Decisive Prussian victory
Battle of Landeshut	HHL	23 June	1760	Prussia	Austria	Silesia	
Siege of Glatz	HHL	26 July	1760	Prussia	Austria	Silesia	
Battle of Liegnitz	HHL	15 August	1760	Prussia	Austria	Silesia	
Raid on Berlin	HRE	12 October	1760	Prussia	Russia; Austria	Brandenburg	Russian and Austrian victory
Battle of Burkersdorf	HHL	21 July	1762	Prussia	Russia	Silesia	
Battle of Gross-Jägersdorf	BAL	30 August	1757	Prussia	Russia	East Prussia	
Blockade of Stralsund (start)	BAL	December	1757	Prussia	Sweden	Stralsund, Swedish Pomerania	Prussians blockaded the Swedes in their fortress but couldn't take it because they lacked naval support
Blockade of Stralsund (conclusion)	BAL	June	1758	Prussia	Sweden; Russia	Stralsund, Swedish Pomerania	Prussians withdrew blockade due to lack of British naval support
Tornow	BAL	26 September	1758	Prussia	Sweden	Tornow (Fürstenberg/Havel) in the Grand Duchy of Mecklenburg-Strelitz	Prussian victory
Battle of Fehrbellin	BAL	28 September	1758	Prussia	Sweden	Fehrbellin, located 60 kilometers (37 mi) NW of Berlin	
Battle of Güstow	BAL	18 November	1758	Prussia	Sweden	Güstow Pomerania	Prussian victory
Battle of Frisches Haff	BAL	10 September	1759	Prussia	Sweden	Oder Lagoon	Swedish victory; Prussia lost its small fleet
Battle of Pasewalk	BAL	3 October	1760	Prussia	Sweden	Draw	Paul von Werner's troops took many prisoners, but abandoned the effort as too costly.
Siege of Kolberg	BAL	4 October	1759	Prussia	Russia	Kolberg, in the Duchy of Brandenburg, on the Baltic Sea.	Prussian victory. First of three sieges.
Battle of Neuensund	BAL	18 September	1761	Prussia	Sweden	Neuensund, Mecklenburg-Vorpommern	Minor skirmish resulting in a Swedish rout of the Prussian force commanded by Wilhelm Sebastian von Belling
Battle of Neukalen	BAL	2 January	1762	Prussia	Sweden		Swedes surprised von Belling's troops near Neukalen. Last battle between Sweden and Prussia
Siege of Almeida	IB	August	1762	Portugal	Spain	Almeida, Portugal	Spanish victory
Battle of Valencia de Alcántara	IB	27 August	1762	Britain; Portugal	Spain	Valencia de Alcántara, near the Portuguese border	Decisive British-Portuguese victory, with negligible losses
Battle of Vila Velha de Ródão	IB	5 October	1762	Britain; Portugal	Spain	Vila Velha de Ródão, Portugal	On 22 November, a truce withdrew Spain from the war.
Battle of Marvão	IB	9–10 November	1761	Great Britain; Portugal	Spain	Marvão, Portugal	British-Portuguese victory. By 22 November, Spain was out of the war.
Siege of Fort St Philip	IB	April – 29 June	1756	Britain	France	Principle British garrison at Fort St. Philip	British sent a relief force commanded by Admiral John Byng; after relief failed, the garrison eventually surrendered
Battle of Minorca	IB	20 May	1756	Britain	France	Mediterranean island of Menorca	British withdrew to Gibraltar; commander was court-martialed and executed.
Raid on Rochefort	FBC	September	1757	Britain	France	Rochefort, a port on the Charente estuary, where it joins the Atlantic.	French victory; British withdraw without capturing Rochefort.
Battle of Cartagena	IB	28 February	1758	Britain	France	Cartagena, Spain	
Action of 29 April 1758	FBC	29 April	1758	Britain	France	naval Bay of Biscay	British victory
Raid on St Malo	FBC	5–12 June	1758	Britain	France	Amphibious assault on Brittany	British tactical victory
Raid on Cherbourg	FBC	7–16 August	1758	Britain	France	northern France	British landed troops in Cherbourg. Withdrew them again
Battle of Saint Cast	FBC	11 September	1758	Britain	France	France	French victory; last of the British descents (amphibious assaults) on northern France
Planned invasion of Britain	FBC	October	1760	Britain	France	scrapped	Plan to invade Britain via Portsmouth; called off after French defeats at Lagos and Quiberon Bay
Battle of Quiberon Bay	FBC	20 November	1759	Great Britain	France	naval	British victory; British naval supremacy confirmed and threat of French invasion of Britain lifted for remainder of the war
Capture of Belle Île	FBC	7 April – 8 June	1761	Britain	France	Belle Île, off the Brittany coast.	
Action of 17 July 1761	FBC	17 July	1761	Britain	France	naval action near Cádiz	British victory
Battle of Chandannagar	IS	23 March	1757	Britain; British East India Company	France	Chandannagar, Bengal	
Battle of Plassey	IS	23 June	1757	British East India Company	France	Plassey, Bengal	
Battle of Cuddalore (1758)	IS	29 April	1758	British East India Company	France	Cuddalore	
Battle of Negapatam (1758)	IS	3 August	1758	British East India Company	France	Naval battle off the Carnatic coast near Negapatam	Indecisive.
Battle of Condore	IS	9 December	1758	British East India Company	France	Condore	
Siege of Madras	IS	14 December	1758	British East India Company	France	Madras	Annus Mirabilis of 1759
Siege of Pondicherry (1760)	IS	4 September	1759	British East India Company	France	Pondicherry	
Battle of Wandiwash	IS	22 January	1760	British East India Company	France	Vandavasi, Tamil Nadu	
Battle of Chinsurah	IS	24–25 September	1759	British East India Company	Dutch East India Company	Chinsurah, Bengal	
Battle of Pondicherry	IS	10 September	1759	British East India Company	France	Pondicherry	indecisive battle
