= List of cities in Mecklenburg-Western Pomerania =

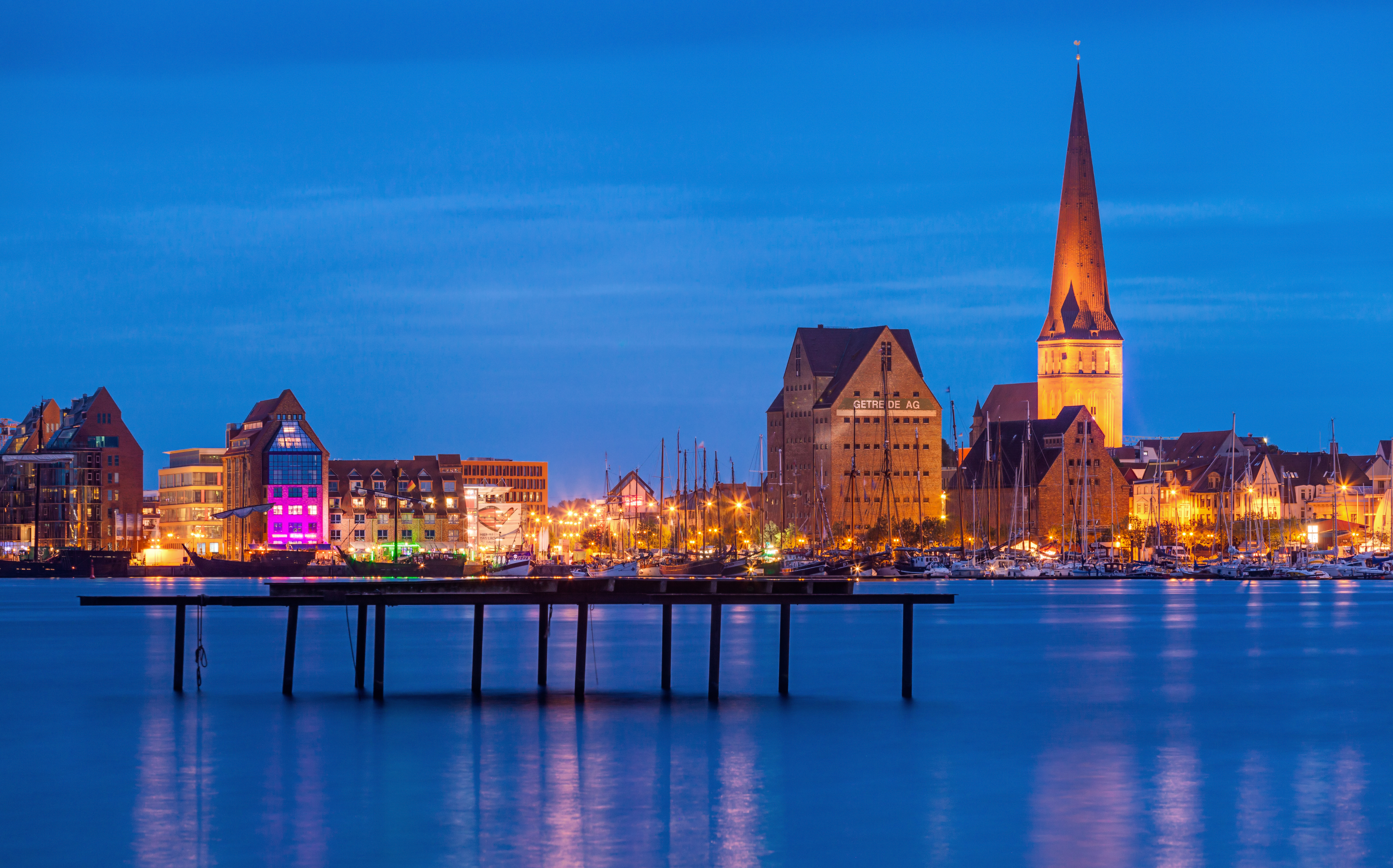
Rostock

In the German state of Mecklenburg-Western Pomerania (German: Mecklenburg-Vorpommern) there are 84 officially recognised towns and cities.

- 17 cities in Landkreis Mecklenburgische Seenplatte
- 16 cities in Landkreis Ludwigslust-Parchim
- 14 cities in Landkreis Vorpommern-Greifswald
- 13 cities in Landkreis Rostock
- 13 cities in Landkreis Vorpommern-Rügen
- 9 cities in Landkreis Nordwestmecklenburg

In addition there are the two district-free cities of Rostock and Schwerin.

== District capitals ==
Current districts of Mecklenburg-Vorpommern, including capitals

There are 6 district capitals in the state of Mecklenburg-Vorpommern:

- Greifswald (Landkreis Vorpommern-Greifswald) Hanseatic city
- Güstrow (Landkreis Rostock)
- Neubrandenburg (Landkreis Mecklenburgische Seenplatte)
- Parchim (Landkreis Ludwigslust-Parchim)
- Stralsund (Landkreis Vorpommern-Rügen) Hanseatic city
- Wismar (Landkreis Nordwestmecklenburg) Hanseatic city

== Table ==
You can sort the table by clicking one of the upper columns. Data from 2017 is included for 21 cities and communes in Mecklenburg-Vorpommern with a population of at least 10,000 on December 31, 2017, as estimated by the Federal Statistical Office of Germany.

| City/Town | Coat of arms | District | first mentioned | Town privileges | Area in km^{2} | Pop. at Dec. 31, 2013 | 2017 est | 2017 pop. density | Image |
|---|---|---|---|---|---|---|---|---|---|
| Altentreptow | coat of arms of the city of Altentreptow | Mecklenburgische Seenplatte | 1245 | 1245 | 52,83 | 4992 | | | Das Rathaus und die Petrikirche in Altentreptow |
| Anklam | coat of arms of the city of Anklam | Vorpommern-Greifswald | 1243 | 1264 | 56,57 | 11917 | 12,521 | 220.9/km² | Peene Harbour of Anklam |
| Bad Doberan | coat of arms of the city of Bad Doberan | Rostock | 1177 | 1879 | 32,74 | 13079 | 12,290 | 374.1/km² | Brick Gothic Doberan Minster |
| Bad Sülze | coat of arms of the city of Bad Sülze | Vorpommern-Rügen | 1243 | 1257 | 26,37 | 1659 | | | Windmill of Bad Sülze |
| Barth | coat of arms of the city of Barth | Vorpommern-Rügen | 1255 | 1255 | 40,83 | 7568 | | | Lange Strasse in Barth |
| Bergen auf Rügen | coat of arms of the city of Bergen auf Rügen | Vorpommern-Rügen | 1314 | 1613 | 51,42 | 13457 | 13,555 | 263.3/km² | Bergens ältestes Fachwerkhaus am Markt, im Hintergrund die St. Marienkirche |
| Boizenburg/Elbe | coat of arms of the city of Boizenburg/Elbe | Ludwigslust-Parchim | 1158 | 1267 | 47,26 | 11048 | 10,630 | 224.1/km² | Boizenburg moat around the old town |
| Brüel | coat of arms of the city of Brüel | Ludwigslust-Parchim | 1222 | 1340 | 27,30 | 2557 | | | Der Rote See bei Brüel |
| Burg Stargard | coat of arms of the city of Burg Stargard | Mecklenburgische Seenplatte | 1244 | 1259 | 61,68 | 5171 | | | Die Burg Stargard |
| Bützow | coat of arms of the city of Bützow | Rostock | 1171 | 1236 | 39,70 | 7745 | | | Das Bützower Rathaus |
| Crivitz | coat of arms of the city of Crivitz | Ludwigslust-Parchim | 1302 | 1302 | 75,48 | 4601 | | | Stadtkirche in Crivitz |
| Dargun | coat of arms of the city of Dargun | Mecklenburgische Seenplatte | 1172 | 1938 | 117,15 | 4100 | | | Darguner Kloster und Schlossruine |
| Dassow | coat of arms of the city of Dassow | Nordwestmecklenburg | 1219 | 1938 | 66,54 | 3922 | | | Der Lütgenhof in Dassow |
| Demmin | coat of arms of the city of Demmin | Mecklenburgische Seenplatte | 1070 | 1236 | 81,56 | 9583 | 10,865 | 132.4/km² | Hafen und Kahldenbrücke über die Peene |
| Dömitz | coat of arms of the city of Dömitz | Ludwigslust-Parchim | 1235 | 1259 | 60,38 | 2864 | | | New Market Square of Dömitz |
| Eggesin | Wappen der Stadt Eggesin | Vorpommern-Greifswald | 1216 | 1966 | 88,01 | 4812 | | | Eggesiner Fachwerkkirche |
| Franzburg | coat of arms of the city of Franzburg | Vorpommern-Rügen | 1231 | 1587 | 15,19 | 1272 | | | Franzburg Abbey Gardens |
| Friedland | coat of arms of the city of Friedland (Mecklenburg) | Mecklenburgische Seenplatte | 1244 | 1244 | 97,64 | 6044 | | | Neubrandenburger Tor und Marienkirche in Friedland |
| Gadebusch | coat of arms of the city of Gadebusch | Nordwestmecklenburg | 1194 | 1225 | 47,65 | 5087 | | | Brick Gothic town hall of Gadebusch |
| Garz/Rügen | coat of arms of the city of Garz/Rügen | Vorpommern-Rügen | 1207 | 1319 | 65,44 | 2170 | | | Ernst Moritz Arndt house of birth in Garz |
| Gnoien | coat of arms of the city of Gnoien | Rostock | 1257 | 1290 | 41,08 | 2703 | | | Ehemalige großherzogliche Post Gnoien |
| Goldberg | coat of arms of the city of Goldberg (Mecklenburg) | Ludwigslust-Parchim | 1227 | 1248 | 64,85 | 3236 | | | Town hall of Goldberg |
| Grabow | coat of arms of the city of Grabow (Elde) | Ludwigslust-Parchim | 1186 | 1252 | 47,68 | 5422 | | | Town hall at Grabow market square |
| Greifswald | coat of arms of the Hanseatic city of Greifswald | Vorpommern-Greifswald | 1241 | 1250 | 50,50 | 56092 | 58,886 | 1,159/km² | Ernst-Moritz-Arndt-Universität Greifswald |
| Grevesmühlen | coat of arms of the city of Grevesmühlen | Nordwestmecklenburg | 1226 | 1261 | 52,32 | 10167 | 10,410 | 198.7/km² | Windmill of Grevesmühlen |
| Grimmen | coat of arms of the city of Grimmen | Vorpommern-Rügen | 1267 | 1287 | 50,29 | 9076 | | | Der Grimmener Wasserturm |
| Güstrow | coat of arms of the city of Güstrow | Rostock | 1222 | 1228 | 70,86 | 28959 | 29,429 | 414.0/km² | Güstrow renaissance palace |
| Gützkow | coat of arms of the city of Gützkow | Vorpommern-Greifswald | 1301 | 1353 | 42,68 | 3034 | | | Gützkower Rathaus |
| Hagenow | coat of arms of the city of Hagenow | Ludwigslust-Parchim | 1190 | 1754 | 67,44 | 12022 | 11,968 | 177.2/km² | Old town and church of Hagenow |
| Jarmen | coat of arms of the city of Jarmen | Vorpommern-Greifswald | 1269 | 1720 | 30,64 | 2787 | | | Port of Jarmen |
| Klütz | coat of arms of the city of Klütz | Nordwestmecklenburg | 1188 | 1938 | 44,12 | 3036 | | | Bothmer Palace |
| Krakow am See | coat of arms of the city of Krakow am See | Rostock | 1298 | 1467 | 87,07 | 3324 | | | Panorama der Stadt Krakow am See |
| Kröpelin | coat of arms of the city of Kröpelin | Rostock | 1177 | 1249 | 67,26 | 4899 | | | Blick auf die Galerieholländerwindmühle vom Markt aus |
| Kühlungsborn | coat of arms of the city of Kühlungsborn | Rostock | 1938 | 1938 | 16,16 | 8088 | | | Strand und Promenade in Kühlungsborn |
| Laage | coat of arms of the city of Laage | Rostock | 1216 | 1336 | 81,27 | 6253 | | | Das Rathaus in Laage |
| Lassan | coat of arms of the city of Lassan | Vorpommern-Greifswald | 1136 | 1274 | 27,98 | 1224 | | | Der Peenestrom bei Wolgast in der Nähe von Lassan |
| Loitz | coat of arms of the city of Loitz | Vorpommern-Greifswald | 1242 | 1242 | 89,53 | 4189 | | | Die Loitzer Marina mit ehemaligem Kleinbahnhof |
| Lübtheen | coat of arms of the city of Lübtheen | Ludwigslust-Parchim | 1363 | 1938 | 119,69 | 4433 | | | Gutshaus in Quassel bei Lübtheen |
| Lübz | coat of arms of the city of Lübz | Ludwigslust-Parchim | 1308 | 1456 | 49,12 | 5892 | | | Amtsturm Lübz |
| Ludwigslust | coat of arms of the city of Ludwigslust | Ludwigslust-Parchim | 1754 | 1876 | 78,30 | 11961 | 12,267 | 195.7/km² | Ludwigslust baroque palace ("Versaille of the North") |
| Malchin | coat of arms of the city of Malchin | Mecklenburgische Seenplatte | 1236 | 1236 | 94,50 | 6767 | | | Kalensches Tor, city gate in Malchin |
| Malchow | coat of arms of the city of Malchow (Mecklenburg) | Mecklenburgische Seenplatte | 1147 | 1235 | 44,60 | 5961 | | | Das mecklenburgische Orgelmuseum in der Klosterkirche zu Malchow |
| Marlow | coat of arms of the city of Marlow | Vorpommern-Rügen | 1210 | 1459 | 139,81 | 4487 | | | Der Marktplatz und das Rathaus von Marlow |
| Mirow | coat of arms of the city of Mirow | Mecklenburgische Seenplatte | 1226 | 1919 | 84,08 | 3711 | | | Schloss Mirow |
| Neubrandenburg | coat of arms of the city of Neubrandenburg | Mecklenburgische Seenplatte | 1248 | 1248 | 85,65 | 60344 | 64,259 | 746.2/km² | Neubrandenburg im Morgennebel, by Caspar David Friedrich |
| Neubukow | coat of arms of the city of Neubukow | Rostock | 1260 | 1435 | 24,99 | 3969 | | | Neubukow Market Square |
| Neukalen | coat of arms of the city of Neukalen | Mecklenburgische Seenplatte | 1174 | 1253 | 46,84 | 1649 | | | Rathaus von Neukalen |
| Neukloster | coat of arms of the city of Neukloster | Nordwestmecklenburg | 1219 | 1938 | 27,49 | 3925 | | | Abbey building Neukloster |
| Neustadt-Glewe | coat of arms of the city of Neustadt-Glewe | Ludwigslust-Parchim | 1248 | 1248 | 93,91 | 6566 | | | Die Alte Burg |
| Neustrelitz | coat of arms of the city of Neustrelitz | Mecklenburgische Seenplatte | 1278 | 1733 | 138,15 | 20191 | 20,135 | 144.0/km² | Royal Church Neustrelitz |
| Parchim | coat of arms of the city of Parchim | Ludwigslust-Parchim | 1170 | 1226 | 106,61 | 17893 | 18,074 | 144.8/km² | Parchim post office |
| Pasewalk | coat of arms of the city of Pasewalk | Vorpommern-Greifswald | 1121 | 1251 | 54,99 | 9666 | 10,281 | 186.2/km² | Amtsgericht von Pasewalk |
| Penkun | coat of arms of the city of Penkun | Vorpommern-Greifswald | 1240 | 1269 | 78,63 | 1707 | | | Penkun Castle |
| Penzlin | coat of arms of the city of Penzlin | Mecklenburgische Seenplatte | 1170 | 1263 | 115,47 | 4033 | | | Penzliner Burg |
| Plau am See | coat of arms of the city of Plau am See | Ludwigslust-Parchim | 1235 | 1226 | 115,99 | 5960 | | | Kanal in Plau am See |
| Putbus | coat of arms of the city of Putbus | Vorpommern-Rügen | 1810 | 1810 | 66,60 | 4441 | | | Circus Putbus |
| Rehna | coat of arms of the city of Rehna | Nordwestmecklenburg | 1230 | 1791 | 22,52 | 3542 | | | Das Kloster Rehna |
| Rerik | coat of arms of the city of Rerik | Rostock | 1238 | 1938 | 33,45 | 2166 | | | Seebrücke von Rerik |
| Ribnitz-Damgarten | coat of arms of the city of Ribnitz-Damgarten | Vorpommern-Rügen | 1950 | 1950 | 122,20 | 15333 | 15,197 | 123.7/km² | Rostock Gate and St. Mary in Ribnitz |
| Richtenberg | coat of arms of the city Richtenberg | Vorpommern-Rügen | 1231 | 1297 | 15,63 | 1301 | | | Richtenberg and the lake Richtenberger See |
| Röbel/Müritz | coat of arms of the city of Röbel/Müritz | Mecklenburgische Seenplatte | 1226 | 1261 | 30,17 | 4684 | | | Aerial view of Röbel |
| Rostock | coat of arms of the Hanseatic city Rostock | Kreisfreie Stadt | 1161 | 1218 | 181,44 | 205307 | 208,409 | 1,149/km² | Das Leuchtfeuer im Hafen Rostock-Warnemünde |
| Sassnitz | coat of arms of the city of Sassnitz | Vorpommern-Rügen | 1906 | 1957 | 46,45 | 8893 | | | Hängebrücke zum Sassnitzer Hafen |
| Schönberg | coat of arms of the city of Schönberg (Mecklenburg) | Nordwestmecklenburg | 1219 | 1822 | 38,09 | 4321 | | | Blick über den Oberteich auf die St.-Laurentius-Kirche |
| Schwaan | coat of arms of the city of Schwaan | Rostock | 1276 | 1276 | 38,28 | 4976 | | | Schwaan church and town hall |
| Schwerin (state capital) | coat of arms of the city of Schwerin | Kreisfreie Stadt | 1018 | 1160 | 130,46 | 98308 | 95,797 | 734.0/km² | Schwerin Palace (seat of the state parliament of Mecklenburg-Vorpommern |
| Stavenhagen | coat of arms of the city of Stavenhagen | Mecklenburgische Seenplatte | 1230 | 1264 | 40,84 | 4855 | | | Barockes Schloss Stavenhagen |
| Sternberg | coat of arms of the city of Sternberg | Ludwigslust-Parchim | 1248 | 1248 | 67,67 | 3769 | | | Die Sternberger Kirche hinter der Stadtmauer |
| Stralsund | coat of arms of the Hanseatic city of Stralsund | Vorpommern-Rügen | 1234 | 1234 | 38,97 | 54094 | 59,517 | 1,099/km² | World Heritage Old Town of Stralsund at the Baltic Sea |
| Strasburg (Uckermark) | coat of arms of the city of Strasburg (Uckermark) | Vorpommern-Greifswald | 1250 | 1250 | 86,83 | 4278 | | | Church of Strasburg (Uckermark) |
| Tessin | coat of arms of the city of Tessin | Rostock | 1121 | 1343 | 24,52 | 4139 | | | Tessiner Kirche |
| Teterow | coat of arms of the city of Teterow | Rostock | 1215 | 1272 | 47,17 | 8186 | | | Teterow Bergring race track |
| Torgelow | coat of arms of the city of Torgelow | Vorpommern-Greifswald | 1281 | 1945 | 49,46 | 8899 | | | Christuskirche in Torgelow |
| Tribsees | coat of arms of the city of Tribsees | Vorpommern-Rügen | 1136 | 1285 | 54,75 | 2506 | | | Tribsees and Trebel river |
| Ueckermünde | coat of arms of the city of Ueckermünde | Vorpommern-Greifswald | 1178 | 1260 | 84,69 | 8768 | | | Strand von Ueckermünde |
| Usedom | coat of arms of the city of Usedom | Vorpommern-Greifswald | 1128 | 1298 | 38,57 | 1499 | | | Marienkirche und Fachwerkhaus in der Stadt Usedom |
| Waren (Müritz) | coat of arms of the city of Waren (Müritz) | Mecklenburgische Seenplatte | 1260 | 1260 | 158,39 | 20260 | 21,210 | 133.0/km² | The Müritzeum aquarium in Waren |
| Warin | coat of arms of the city of Warin | Nordwestmecklenburg | 1178 | 1306 | 44,26 | 3255 | | | Stiftskirche in Warin |
| Wesenberg | coat of arms of the city of Wesenberg (Mecklenburg) | Mecklenburgische Seenplatte | 1252 | 1252 | 89,43 | 2992 | | | Die Wesenberger Burg |
| Wismar | coat of arms of the Hanseatic city of Wismar | Nordwestmecklenburg | 1147 | 1226 | 41,36 | 43329 | 42,906 | 1,028/km² | Wismar waterworks |
| Wittenburg | coat of arms of the city of Stadt Wittenburg | Ludwigslust-Parchim | 1154 | 1230 | 46,25 | 6300 | | | Town hall of Wittenburg |
| Woldegk | coat of arms of the city of Woldegk | Mecklenburgische Seenplatte | 1236 | 1298 | 103,70 | 4045 | | | Museumsmühle |
| Wolgast | coat of arms of the city of Wolgast | Vorpommern-Greifswald | 1123 | 1257 | 61,52 | 10991 | 12,084 | 195.7/km² | Peene bridge in Wolgast |
| Zarrentin am Schaalsee | coat of arms of the city of Zarrentin am Schaalsee | Ludwigslust-Parchim | 1139 | 1938 | 91,89 | 5312 | | | Konventsgebäude |

== Former cities on the current territory of Mecklenburg-Vorpommern ==
| City | Coat of arms | District | First mentioned | City from-until | |
|---|---|---|---|---|---|
| Altkalen | N/A | Rostock | 1174 | 1253–1281 | Town privileges given to Neukalen |
| Damgarten | | Vorpommern-Rügen | 1258 | 1258–1950 | 1950 fusion with Ribnitz to Ribnitz-Damgarten |
| Feldberg | | Mecklenburgische Seenplatte | 1256 | 1919–1999 | on June 13, 1999 incorporated in Feldberger Seenlandschaft |
| Kummerow | | Mecklenburgische Seenplatte | 1222 | 1255–1671 | after depopulation in 30-years-war |
| Ribnitz | | Vorpommern-Rügen | 1210 | 1233–1950 | 1950 fusion with Damgarten to Ribnitz-Damgarten |
| Strelitz-Alt | | Mecklenburgische Seenplatte | 1278 | 1349–1931 | 1931 incorporation into Neustrelitz |
