= Blockade of Stralsund =

Prussian military operation

- Part of the Pomeranian War (Seven Years' War)
Date	December 1757 – June 1758
Location	Stralsund, Swedish Pomerania (today Stralsund, Germany) 54°18′33″N 13°04′55″E
Result	Prussian forces withdraw

Belligerents
Prussia	Sweden

Commanders and leaders
Hans von Lehwaldt	Fredrik von Rosen

The Blockade of Stralsund occurred during the Seven Years' War when a Prussian force invested the Swedish garrison of Stralsund, the capital of Swedish Pomerania. Rather than lay formal siege to the port, the Prussians cut it off by land and blockaded it. They were unable to cut it off by sea, owing to a lack of a Prussian fleet, and eventually the blockade was abandoned when the bulk of Prussian forces were withdrawn to fight in other theatres.

== Background ==
Sweden had entered the Seven Years' War in 1757, joining France, Russia, Austria and Saxony in their alliance against the Prussians. During Autumn 1757, with Prussian forces tied up elsewhere, the Swedes had been able to move south and occupy a large portion Pomerania. Following the retreat of the Russians from East Prussia, after the Battle of Gross-Jägersdorf, Frederick the Great ordered his General Hans von Lehwaldt to move west to Stettin to confront the Swedes. The Prussian troops proved to be better equipped and trained than the Swedes, and were soon able to push them back into Swedish Pomerania. The Prussians pressed home their advance, taking over Anklam and Demmin. The Swedes were left at the stronghold of Stralsund and the island of Rügen. Fredrik von Rosen was sent out to take over command of the Swedish forces.

== Blockade ==
As Stralsund was not about to surrender it became apparent that the Prussians required naval support if they were to force it to yield. In light of this Frederick repeatedly requested that his British allies send a fleet into the Baltic Sea. Wary of being drawn into conflict with Sweden and Russia, with whom they were not at war, the British declined. They justified their decision by explaining their ships were needed elsewhere. The failure of Frederick to gain fleet support from the Royal Navy was a major factor in the failure of the Prussians to take Stralsund.

During this period the Prussians forcibly recruited men from occupied Swedish Pomerania. The French had to keep the Swedish war effort afloat both by paying them subsidies, and by paying Denmark not to enter the war on Prussia's side.

== Aftermath ==
When the 1758 campaigning season commenced, the Prussian forces around Stralsund were needed more urgently on the Russian front and were mostly withdrawn - bringing an effective end to the blockade. It wasn't until after the Prussians had suffered a major defeat at Battle of Kunersdorf in 1759 and their forces were once again tied down on other fronts that the Swedes again went on the offensive again and won the Battle of Frisches Haff. In spite of this the Swedes made only limited progress and in 1762, when the Russians pulled out of the war, the Swedes made peace with the Prussians by the Treaty of Hamburg.

== Bibliography ==
- Atkins, S.R. From Utrecht to Waterloo. London, 1965
- Millar, Simon and Hook, Adam. Rossbach and Leuthen 1757: Prussia's Eagle Resurgent. Osprey, 2002.
- Oakley, Stewart P. War and peace in the Baltic, 1560-1790. Routledge 1992
- Szabo, Franz A.J. The Seven Years War in Europe, 1757-1763. Pearson, 2008.
