= Jacob Magnus Sprengtporten's revolt =

Military revolt in Finland in 1772

Magnus Sprengtporten's revolt
- Part of the Revolution of 1772
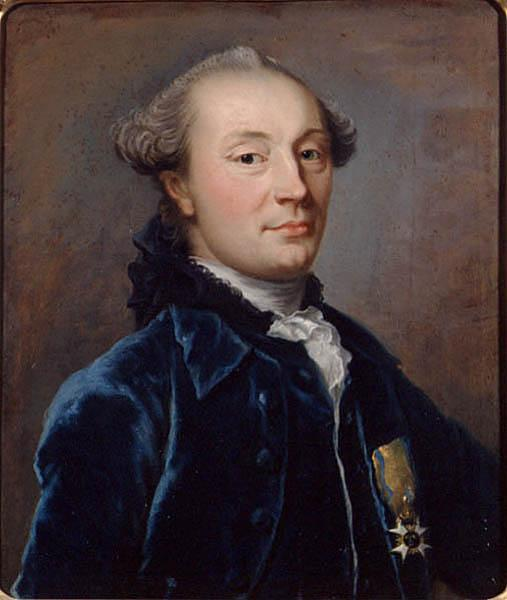
- Magnus Sprengtporten, the leader of the uprising.
Date	1772
Location	Finland
Result	Revolutionary victory
Territorial changes	Helsinki, Porvoo, and Sveaborg captured by the rebels

Insurgents-Government
Supporters of Gustav III (Opposition to Parliamentary Rule)	The Riksdag of the Estates (Government)

Commanders and leaders
Jacob Magnus Sprengtporten; Georg Magnus Sprengtporten	Carl Björnberg (POW); Christian Reuterholm (POW)

Strength
780-800 men	Unknown

Jacob Magnus Sprengtporten's revolt was an armed rebellion that took place in Finland in 1772, it was commanded by Jacob Magnus Sprengtporten who aimed to secure it for Gustav III's coup d'état.

== Background ==
In 1718, after the death of Charles XII in Norway, the Age of Liberty in Sweden had officially begun, resulting in a shift away from authoritarianism. However, in 1772, the Swedish king, Gustav III, organized a coup which would allow him to become an absolute monarch, the original plans were moslty made by Jacob Magnus Sprengtporten.

=== Plan ===
Several different coup plans were presented by Sprengtporten, one where during the coronation of Gustav III, the king would place himself at the head of the Uppland garrison who were summoned to the festivities to force a regime change, however Gustav III hesitated to this plan.

In May, Sprengtporten presented his final plan to Gustav III. According to the plan, the rebellion would begin in Finland, where Sprengtporten had influence and preparations would mostly go unnoticed. He would force the Sveaborg garrison to support the king and then sail over to Stockholm to seize power. The king liked the plan and Sprengtporten departed to Finland on 29 July.

== Revolt ==
Jacob Magnus Sprengtporten arrived at Porvoo (Borgå) on 12–13 August 1772, and executed the plan. During his journey to Sveaborg, his brother Georg Magnus Sprengtporten led an armed capture of Porvoo. The citizens of Porvoo swore allegiance to Gustav III but the clergy did not. Sprengtporten landed at Sveaborg four days later with 60 dragoons undetected and arrested the commander, Carl Björnberg, was quickly arrested and the officers and soldiers were persuaded to join the revolt. Sprengtporten then went to Helsinki and convinced the military and population to swear allegiance to the king after capturing the city.

The revolt later spread to more parts of Finland, Councillor of the Realm Christian Reuterholm was arrested on his property in Uusimaa. Postal services going from Åland to Sweden were also cut off. Only at Turku (Åbo) did Sprengtporten face some resistance. After capturing Helsinki, he sailed to Stockholm with 780-800 men intending to support the king in his seizure of the city. However, strong headwinds made the journey difficult and once he arrived on 7 September, the king had already seized power on 19 August.

== Aftermath ==
Sprengtporten was rewarded for his actions in the coup. He received a promotion to Lieutenant General and was appointed head of the lifeguard, simultaneously he was also awarded the Commander's Badge of the Order of the Sword with the large cross. After Augustin Ehrensvärd's death in 1772 he was appointed leader of the fortification works in Finland. When he was proposed as the commander-in-chief of the troops in Finland in 1773, he declined the proposal since he did not have the full support of the war council for his plans.
