= Revolution of 1772 =

Coup by Gustav III of Sweden

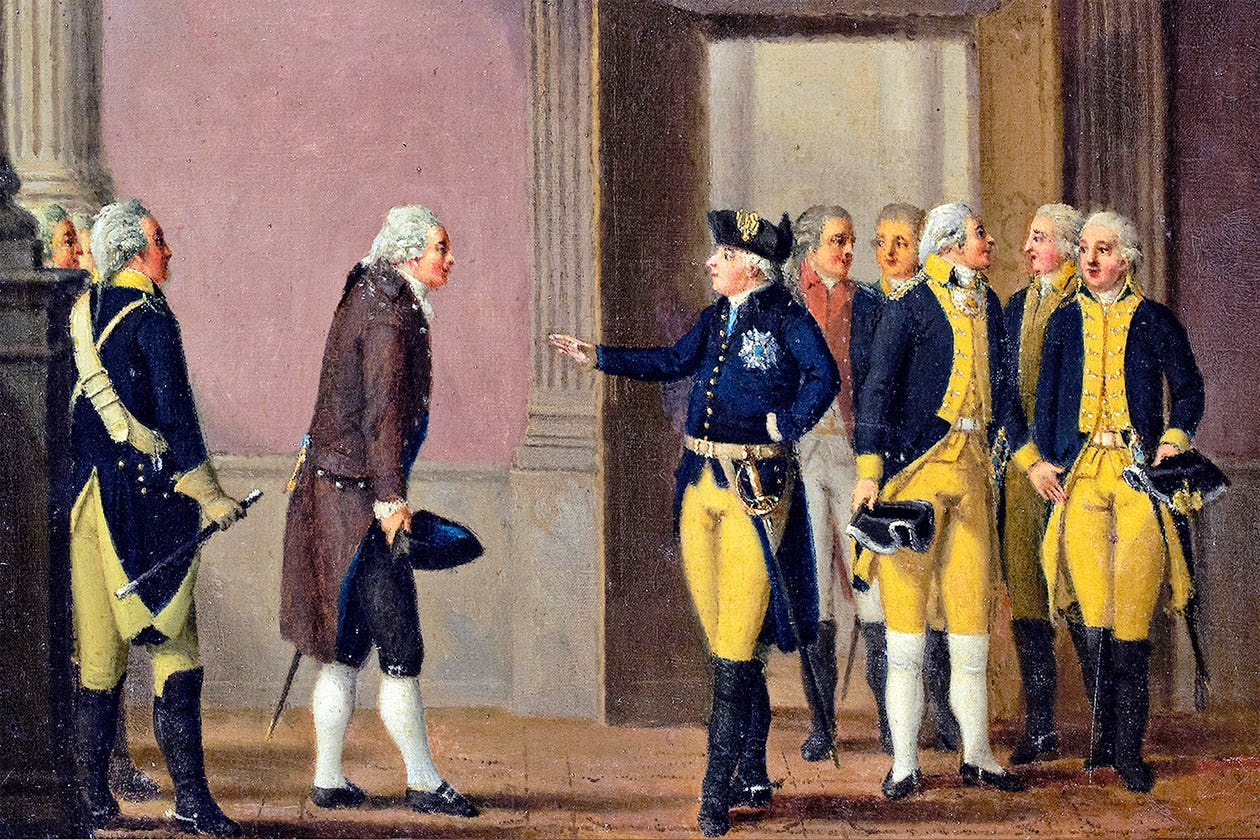
- Gustav III initiating the coup in 1772.
Date	19 August 1772
Location	Finland, Stockholm
Result	Revolutionary victory

Insurgents-Government
Supporters of Gustav III (Opposition to Parliamentary Rule); Supported by: France; Finnish loyalists	The Riksdag of the Estates (Government)

Commanders and leaders
Gustav III; Jacob Magnus Sprengtporten; Göran Magnus	Carl Björnberg (POW); Esbjörn Reuterholm (POW)

Strength
Unknown	Unknown

Casualties and losses
None	None

The Revolution of 1772, also known as The Bloodless Revolution (Swedish: Revolutionen) or the Coup of Gustav III (Gustav III:s statskupp or older Gustav III:s statsvälvning), was a Swedish coup d'état performed by King Gustav III on 19 August 1772 to introduce a division of power between the King and the Riksdag of the Estates, resulting in the end of the Age of Liberty and the introduction of the Swedish Constitution of 1772, which would strengthen the power of the monarch and the start the absolutist period known as the Gustavian era.

== Background ==
The Age of Liberty was a period in Swedish history spanning from 1718 to 1772, that marked the end of the country's first period of absolutism (1680–1719) and the beginning of a period of constitutional monarchy and parliamentary government. The 1720 Instrument of Government was the constitution of the Kingdom of Sweden from 1720 to 1772, having replaced the largely identical 1719 Instrument of Government, resulting in an increase in the power of the Riksdag of the Estates. This period saw the introduction of various reforms, including freedom of the press and the abolition of torture.

By the mid-18th century, the Age of Liberty had become a period of political stagnation and corruption. Furthermore, the Riksdag had become deeply divided and unable to effectively govern the country, leading to calls for reform from various quarters. Through his mother Louisa Ulrika, Gustav had developed sympathy for enlightened absolutism, and he now sought help from the French government to introduce such a form of government in Sweden.

From the mid-1760s, Gustav began to emerge increasingly as a political force and became a unifying figure around whom hopes gathered for liberation from endless party squabbling and a renaissance of royal power. France declared its firm commitment to the idea of seeking to restore the monarchical power in Sweden on a secure foundation.

During the 1771–72 Riksdag, Gustav had attempted to make peace between the fiercely warring parties, but had been rejected. Shortly thereafter, he secretly received calls from Louis XV of France and the French Foreign Minister Emmanuel Armand de Vignerot du Plessis, Duke of Aiguillon to carry out a coup d'état. In such a case, the King could count on substantial French assistance.

The first person to give the King's plans a more definite direction was Colonel Jacob Magnus Sprengtporten, who was the leader of a club with royalist leanings. The club, called Svenska botten, consisted mainly of noble officers who saw their class privileges threatened by the ruling party and felt their existence was uncertain due to the arbitrary interference of the estates in the promotion system, as well as the cutbacks that affected the defense forces. The plan was to win over the large garrisons at the fortresses of Sveaborg and Kristianstad for the King and then march on Stockholm. Sprengtporten was responsible for Sveaborg and Master Forester Johan Christopher Toll, for Kristianstad.

== The Revolution ==
The circumstances forced Gustav to take action himself. Gustav carried out a coup d'état on August 19, 1772, without a drop of blood being shed, which made him master of the Riksdag and the council.

A new, constitutional, but in many respects unclear constitution, the 1772 Instrument of Government, was adopted on August 20 by the estates. The estates were then dismissed. The new conditions were accepted by the whole country to general satisfaction. The greatest difficulty that the new phase had to contend with was the dissatisfaction of neighboring states. But the timing was fortunate, in that Russia was preoccupied with a war with Turkey and, like Prussia, eager to first and foremost secure the spoils from the partition of Poland. Denmark-Norway immediately began armament preparations, but through his determined behavior and diplomatic skill, Gustav managed to avert the threat of war and was able to calmly devote himself to the internal reforms that lay ahead.

Gustav approached this task with great enthusiasm, inspired as much by a burning zeal for his country's welfare as by the reformist fervor of the Age of Enlightenment. Numerous and significant were also the measures he took to improve the country's administrative, economic, and cultural situation. The civil service was placed under stricter control, and old ingrained habits were abolished, while at the same time a wage regulation created the conditions for a whole new generation of civil servants, who in terms of diligence and integrity were on a different level than their predecessors. Legal certainty was promoted, and criminal law was reformed in accordance with the humane ideas of the time. Great attention was paid to public health and medical care, and measures were taken to remedy the neglected state of Finland. Above all, it was important to organize the monetary system, restore balance to the state's finances, and breathe new life into the economy.

== See also ==
- Hovpartiet
- Coup of 1756
- December Crisis (1768)
- Coup of 1809
- Royal Life Guards' Mutiny

== Bibliography ==
- Beth Hennings, Gustav III: En biografi (1957), Norstedts förlag 1990 ISBN 91-1-893862-0
- Berättelser ur svenska historien / 42. Frihetstidens sista år och Revolutionen 1772
- Åberg, Alf (1978). Vår Svenska Historia (in Swedish). Stockholm: Natur och kultur. ISBN 9127007839.
