= Pawłowo, Kwidzyn County =

Pawłowo
- Village
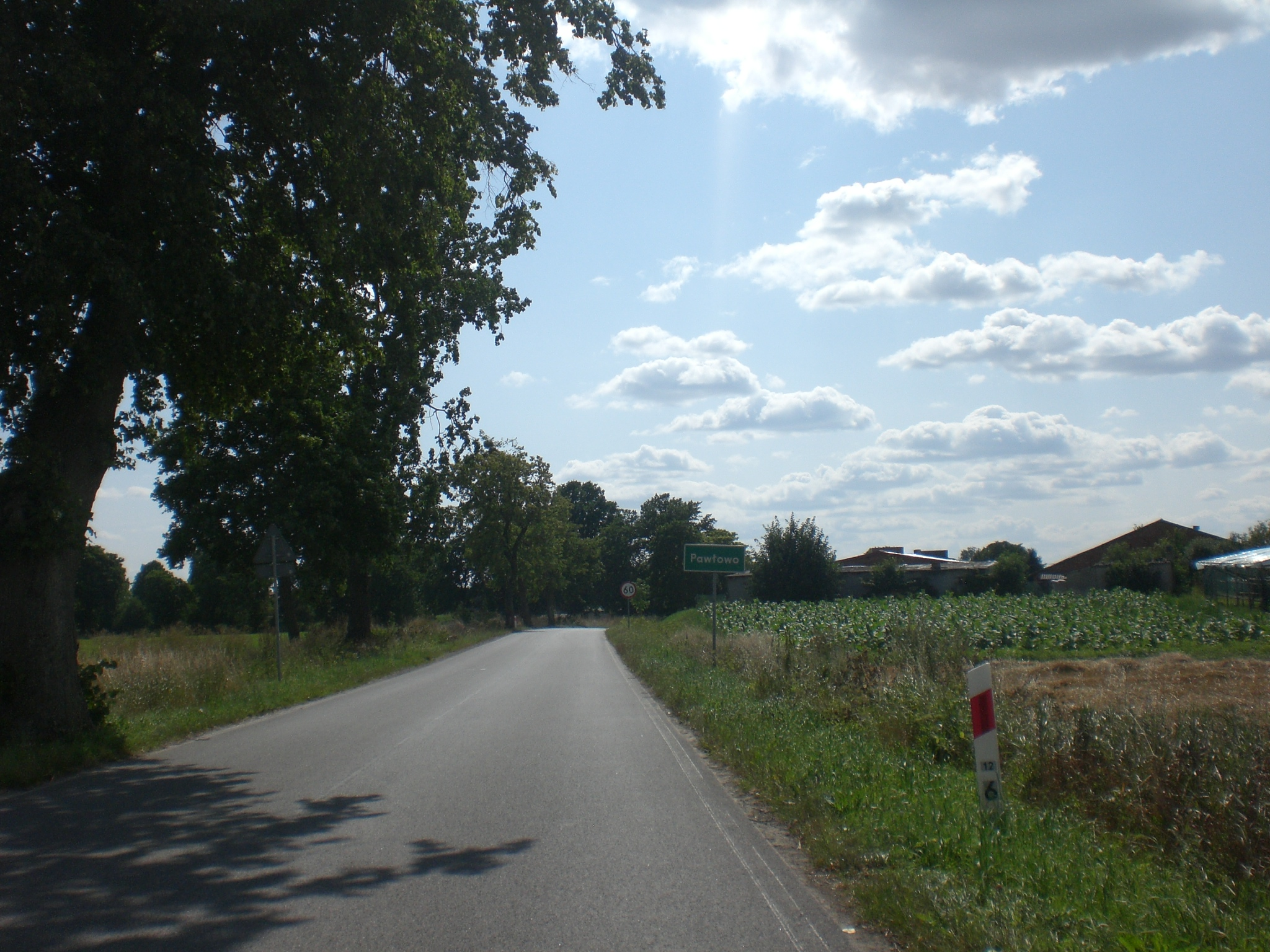

- Location within Poland
- Coordinates: 53°36′25″N 19°6′42″E
- Country: Poland
- Voivodeship: Pomeranian
- County: Kwidzyn
- Gmina: Gardeja
- Population: 150

Pawłowo [paˈvwɔvɔ] is a village in the administrative district of Gmina Gardeja, within Kwidzyn County, Pomeranian Voivodeship, in northern Poland. It is located in the region of Powiśle.

== Notable residents ==
- Wilhelm Sebastian von Belling, (1719-1779), German general
