= Battle of Neukalen =

1762 battle

- Part of the Pomeranian War (Seven Years' War)
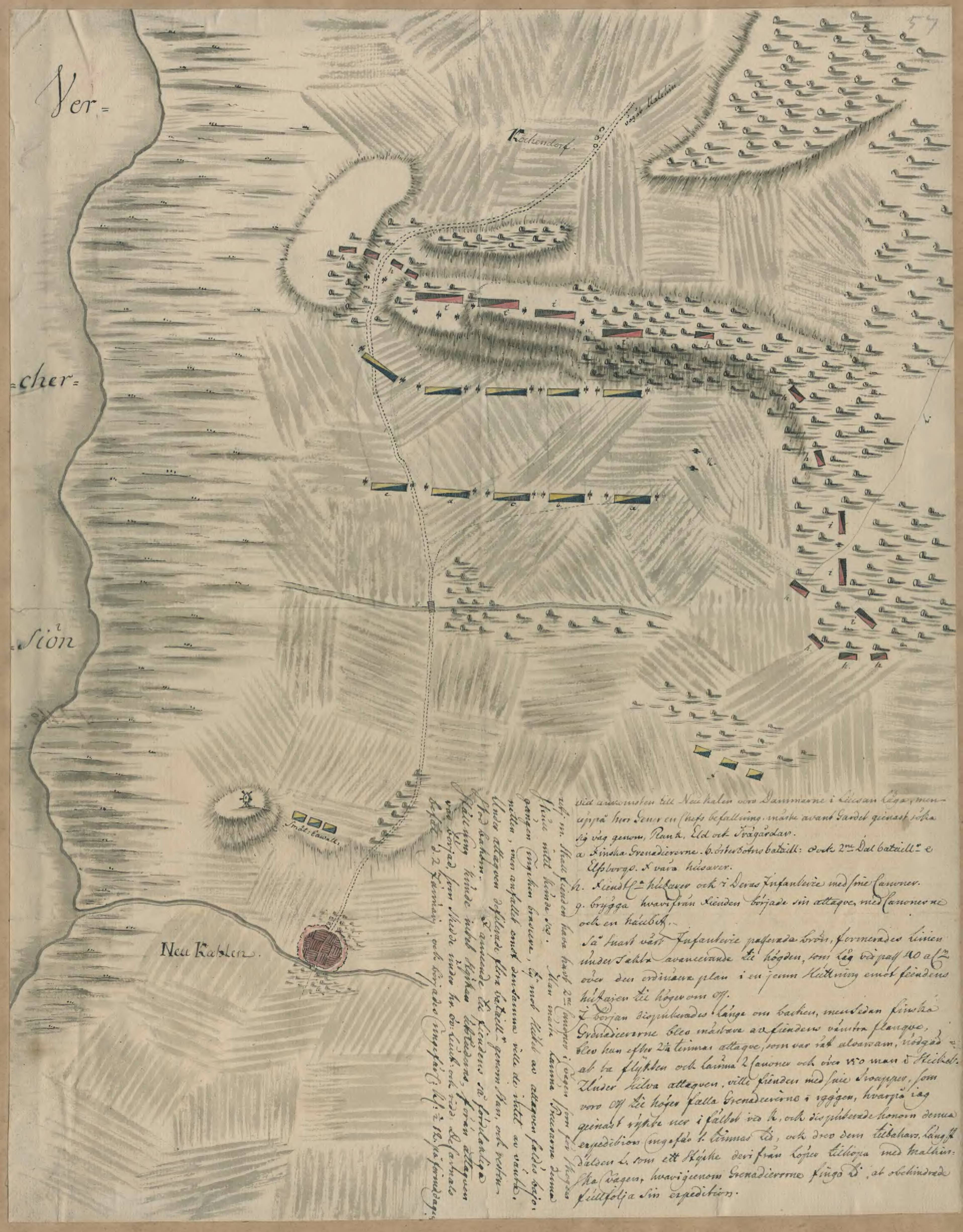
- Map over the Battle of Neukalen (with a description)
Date	2 January 1762
Location	Neukalen, Germany
Result	Swedish victory

Belligerents
Sweden	Prussia

Commanders and leaders
(Sweden) Carl Constantin De Carnall	(Kingdom of Prussia) Wilhelm Sebastian von Belling

Strength
4,000	2,000

Casualties and losses
174	350

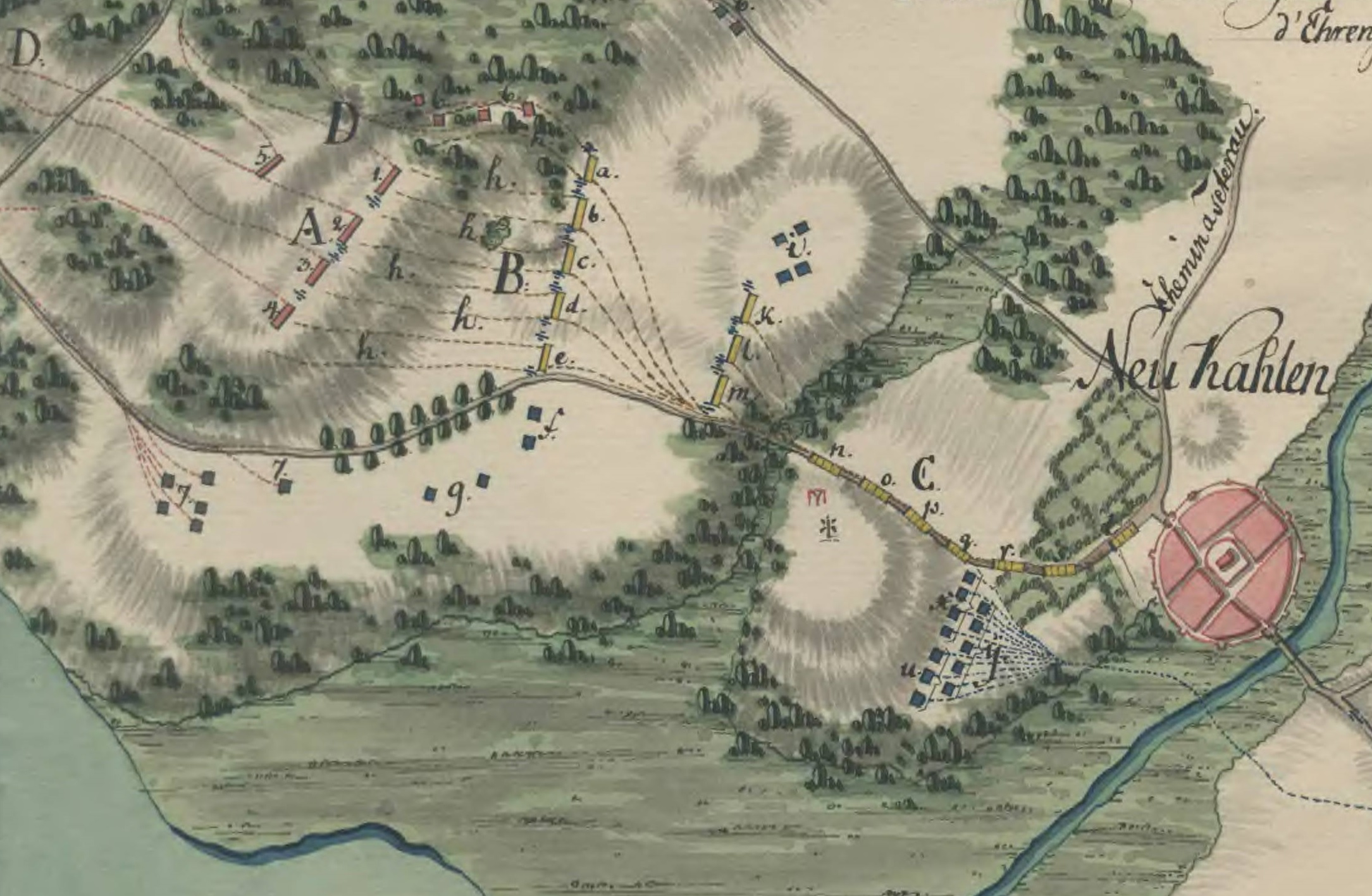
Map over the battle (cropped)

The Battle of Neukalen was a battle at Neukalen of the Seven Years' War between Swedish and Prussian forces fought on 2 January 1762. The Swedish force under the command of Carl Constantin De Carnall managed to rout the Prussian forces under Wilhelm Sebastian von Belling positioned on a hill next to the town of Malchin. This was the last battle of the Swedish and Prussian troops during the war. The Swedes had a total of 4,000 men, in eight 8 battalions and several hundred cavalry. However, only the first line of 2,000 infantry (5 battalions) and 200 cavalry took part in the fighting. The Prussian force consisted of more than 2,000 men, in 5 battalions, 2 companies and a hussar regiment (10 squadrons). The Swedes had 37 killed and 137 wounded, while the Prussians had 50 killed, 120 wounded, and 180 captured.

== Citations and sources ==
=== Sources ===
- Försök till en Historia öfver det förra Pommerska Kriget: 1757 - 1762, Gustaf von Schantz
- Heinsius, Johann Samuel (1762). Neue genealogisch-historische Nachrichten von den vornehmsten Begebenheiten, welche sich an den europäischen Höfen zugetragen. Volume 13 (in German). Leipzig: Heinsius. OCLC 985612928.
