= Jacob Magnus Sprengtporten =

Swedish army officer (1727–1786)

Friherre Jacob Magnus Sprengtporten
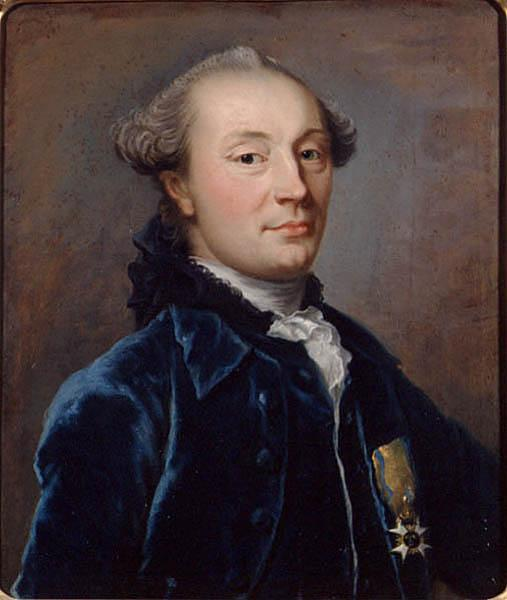
- Portrait by Carl Friedrich Bender, c. 1770–1780
- Born: 10 November 1727; Borgå, Kingdom of Sweden
- Died: 2 April 1786 (aged 58); Stockholm, Kingdom of Sweden
- Relatives: Georg Magnus Sprengtporten (half-brother)
- Military career
- Allegiance: Sweden
- Branch: Swedish Army
- Service years: 1739–1774
- Rank: Lieutenant general
- Commands: Sprengtporten's Free Corps (1761–1762); Nyland and Tavastehus County Cavalry Regiment (1769–1772); Life Guard Dragoons (1772–1774)
- Conflicts: Pomeranian War; Battle of Neuensund; Jacob Magnus Sprengtporten's revolt
- Awards: Order of the Seraphim (1778)

Baron Jacob Magnus Sprengtporten (10 November 1727 – 2 April 1786) was a Swedish-Finnish army officer and politician, and half-brother of Georg Magnus Sprengtporten. He is most famous as one of the leaders of the Revolution of 1772, the coup d'état that ended the age of constitutional monarchy in Sweden known as the Age of Liberty and ushered in the period of absolute monarchy known as the Gustavian era.

== Biography ==
=== Family and early career ===
Sprengtporten's father was Baron Magnus Wilhelm Sprengtporten, who resided at Borgå (now Porvoo) in Finland, which was then part of the Kingdom of Sweden. Magnus Wilhelm was a major in the Swedish Army and served in the army of King Charles XII during the Great Northern War. He participated in the Swedish invasion of Russia in 1708–9, and was one of the thousands of Caroleans captured in the Surrender at Perevolochna. He subsequently spent thirteen years as a Russian prisoner-of-war before being released in 1722 and returning to Finland. He and his wife Anna Margareta Amnorin went on to have three sons, of whom the second was Jacob Magnus, born in 1727.

Sprengtporten followed in his father's footsteps by joining the Swedish Army as a volunteer in 1739, at the age of 12. In 1743 he received a prestigious posting to the Life Guards, the royal guards regiment, and became a commissioned officer with the rank of fänrik (second lieutenant). In 1747 he was transferred to work on fortifications in Finland under the famous military engineer Augustin Ehrensvärd, and he became a captain of engineers himself in 1755. When the Pomeranian War broke out in 1757 he was initially assigned to act as adjutant to Lieutenant-General Axel von Fersen, but later on he was promoted to lieutenant-colonel and given command of a free corps, known after him as Sprengtportenska Frikåren (the Sprengporten Free Corps). As commander of the Free Corps he defeated a somewhat larger Prussian force at the 1761 Battle of Neuensund, and was one of the few officers to emerge with any credit from what was generally an unsuccessful war for Sweden.

=== The 1772 coup ===
Sprengtporten's status as a war hero, and his prior familiarity with the Finnish fortifications, led to his being selected in 1766 to compose a report on the state of Finland's border defences, and his subsequent lobbying of the government to implement his recommendations drew him into politics for the first time.

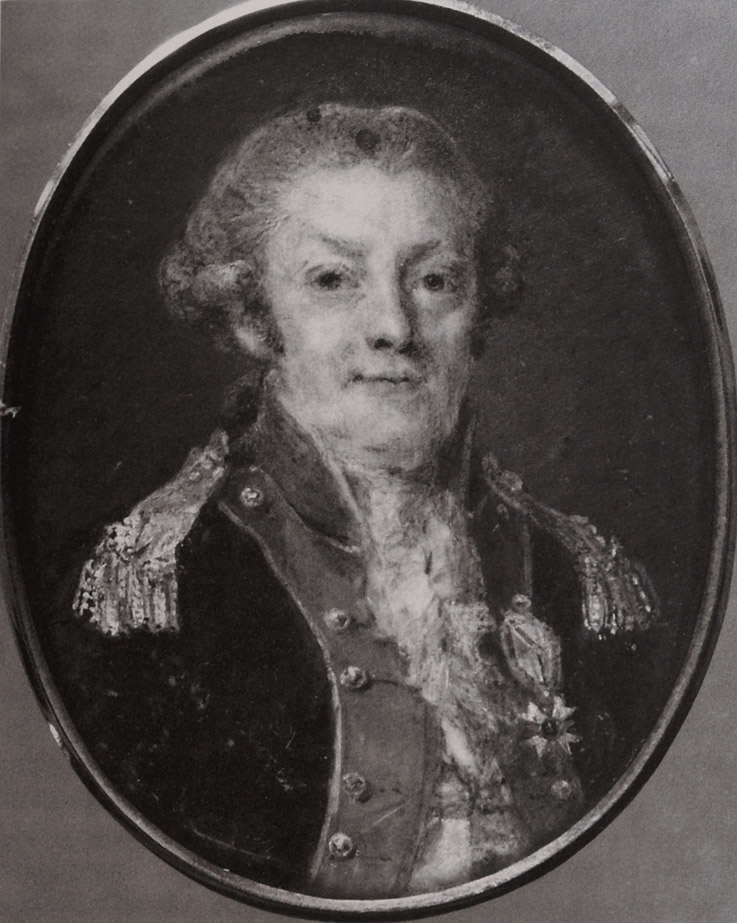
Jacob Magnus Sprengtporten. Painting by Peter Adolf Hall.

At the time Sweden was governed as a constitutional monarchy under the Instrument of Government (1720), with the king being essentially a figurehead and real power resting with the Riksdag of the Estates (parliament). The two main parties in the Riksdag were the "Caps", who generally favoured the promotion of commerce and close ties to the Russian Empire and Great Britain, and the "Hats", who had revanchist dreams of rebuilding the Swedish Empire and therefore favoured an alliance with France and a more bellicose foreign policy. The Hats enjoyed strong support among the aristocracy and army officers, and Sprengtporten was sympathetic to their views and sometimes seen as one of their leaders, but he was frustrated by the indecision, capriciousness and short-termism of parliamentary government and became convinced that the constitution had to be changed to create a stronger executive.

King Gustav III, who came to the throne in 1771, was also unhappy with the present constitutional system. Immediately after his coronation he proposed to the Riksdag that the constitution be amended to give the Crown more powers, but the move was blocked by both Caps and Hats. Sprengtporten subsequently became disillusioned with his former Hat allies and began plotting a coup d'état with the aid of a club of like-minded aristocrats known as Svenska Botten.

The conspirators contacted the king and received his assent to their scheme. They planned that Sprengtporten would lead a mutiny among the large garrison at Sveaborg Fortress, in his native Finland, and then ship these troops over to Stockholm to seize the capital and overthrow the government. At the same time Johan Christopher Toll would lead a second mutiny at Kristianstad, in Skåne, to tie down government forces in the south.

Sprengtporten arrived at Sveaborg on 16 August and successfully persuaded the garrison to follow him after producing tokens from the king. However, contrary winds prevented his ships from leaving Finland for several days, and although Toll's mutiny at Kristianstad had also been successful, he too was unable to move his troops to Stockholm immediately. In the meantime word reached the capital that an insurrection was in progress, enabling the government to send out orders for all available forces to converge on the city and defend it from the rebels. It appeared that the coup had missed its window of opportunity, but at this crucial moment the king himself seized the initiative. On 19 August he managed to rally the Stockholm garrison and then marched on the Riksdag, arrested the government and formally effected the switch to absolute monarchy by promulgating the Instrument of Government (1772). Sprengtporten was not able to reach Stockholm until 7 September, by which time the new regime had already been in place for almost three weeks.

=== Later life ===
King Gustav handsomely rewarded Sprengtporten for his support, most notably by promoting him to the rank of lieutenant-general and giving him command of the Life Guards regiment in which he had begun his military career thirty years earlier. However, Sprengtporten was embarrassed by his failure to arrive in time to assist with the coup in Stockholm, and he became deeply insecure about the matter, and also jealous of the king for taking the role of heroic revolutionary leader which he had hoped to fulfill himself. When the Italian priest and writer Domenico Michelessi published an account of the coup in 1773, Sprengtporten was so incensed by the fact that he wasn't given a prominent role in the narrative that he sought Michelessi out and struck him with a cane. Michelessi protested that his book had been endorsed by the king, whereupon Sprengtporten demanded a formal inquiry to vindicate his complaints, and even threatened to resign from the army if this was not arranged. He was talked down on this occasion, but his self-destructive tendencies only grew worse over the following months. He again threatened to resign over the winter of 1773–4, after the king only partially accepted his recommendations concerning the defence of Finland against a possible Russian invasion, and finally went through with the threat in the spring of 1774 after failing to get his way over a trivial issue relating to a brawl between soldiers from different regiments.

Sprengtporten received a generous pension of 30,000 riskdaler annually, and subsequently retired to a house in Djurgården. In retirement he remained a crotchety and cantankerous figure, but nevertheless received occasional visits from the king, who was genuinely grateful for his role in setting the Revolution of 1772 in motion. As a gesture of his continuing respect for Sprengtporten, Gustav made him a knight of the Order of the Seraphim in 1778.

Toward the end of his life Sprengporten attempted to write a set of memoirs, but failed to complete them before his death in 1786. He never married, and left no known children.

== See also ==
- Revolution of 1772
- Georg Magnus Sprengtporten
- Gustav III of Sweden
- Pomeranian War

== Sources ==
- Bain, Robert Nisbet (1911). "Sprengtporten, Jakob Magnus" . Encyclopædia Britannica. Vol. 25 (11th ed.). p. 738.
- Norman, Hans (2007–2011). "Jacob Magnus Sprengtporten (Sprengtport)". Svenskt Biografiskt Lexikon.
- "Sprengtporten, 2. Jakob Magnus". Nordisk Familjebok: 791–3. 1917.
