= Battle of Güstow =

Eighteenth-century battle

- Part of the Pomeranian War (Seven Years' War)
Date	18 November 1758
Location	Güstow, near Prenzlau, Germany
Result	Prussian victory

Belligerents
(Kingdom of Prussia) Prussia	Sweden

Commanders and leaders
Unknown	Reinhold Johan von Lingen

Strength
Unknown	1,100 infantry 500 cavalry 4 guns

The Battle of Güstow, also known as the Battle of Tornow took place during the Pomeranian War in the Seven Years' War fought between Prussia and Sweden near the village Güstow in Germany on 18 November 1758. The battle ended with a Prussian victory.
