= Altkalen =

- Municipality
- Location of Altkalen within Rostock district
- Interactive map of Altkalen
- Location within Germany Location within Mecklenburg-Vorpommern
- Coordinates: 53°53′N 12°45′E
- Country: Germany
- State: Mecklenburg-Vorpommern
- District: Rostock
- Municipal assoc.: Gnoien

Government
  - Mayor: Renate Awe

Area
  - Total: 45.74 km^{2} (17.66 sq mi)
- Elevation: 37 m (121 ft)

Population (2025-12-31)
  - Total: 786
  - Density: 17.2/km^{2} (44.5/sq mi)
- Time zone: UTC+01:00 (CET)
  - Summer (DST): UTC+02:00 (CEST)
- Postal codes: 17179
- Dialling codes: 039971
- Vehicle registration: LRO

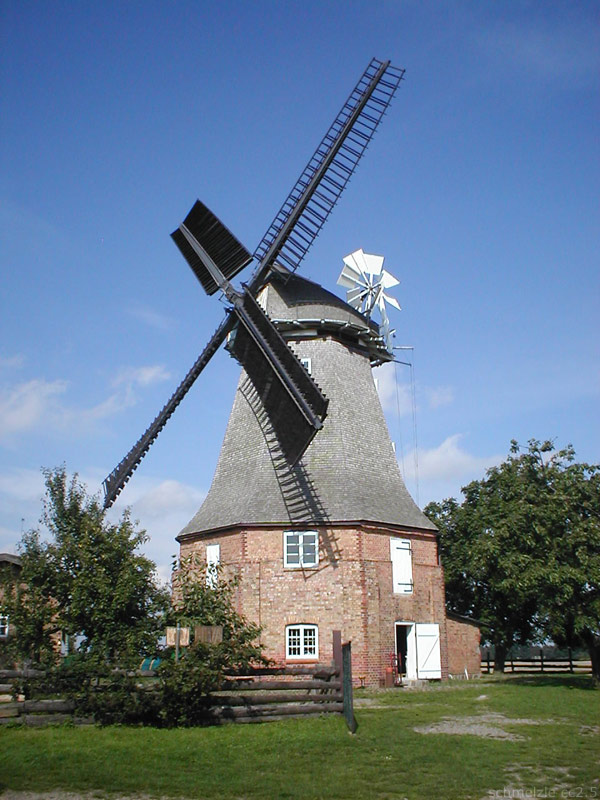
A Windmill near Altkalen

Altkalen (German pronunciation: [altˈkaːlən], lit. 'Old Kalen', in contrast to "New Kalen") is a municipality in the Rostock district, in Mecklenburg-Vorpommern, Germany.

== History ==
Kalen was first mentioned in a document from 1174. The name "Kalen" is of Slavic origin and means "marsh" or "morass". After 1236, Kalen was expanded as a city with a strong fortification.
