= Battle of Frisches Haff =

1759 naval battle of the Seven Years' War

- Part of the Pomeranian War
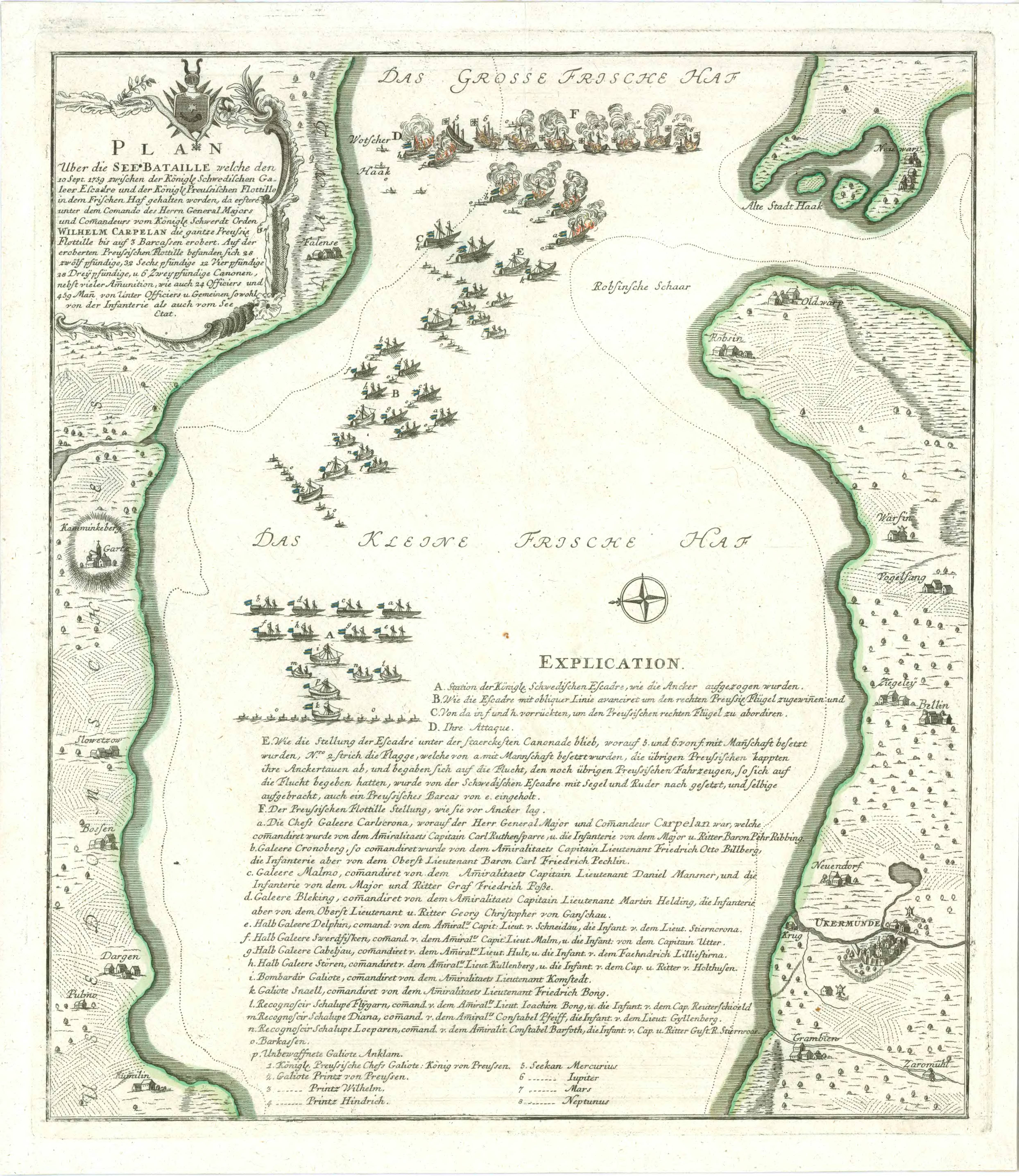
- Seeschlacht im Stettiner Haff 1759, Unknown author
Date	10 September 1759
Location	Oder Lagoon, Oder, Prussia 53°48′16″N 14°08′25″E
Result	Swedish victory

Belligerents
Sweden	Prussia

Commanders and leaders
Karl Rutensparre	Ernst von Köller

Strength
4 galleys 4 demi-galleys 2 galiots 3 sloops 13 gunboats	4 galleys 4 galiots 4 gunboats

Casualties and losses
44 killed and wounded 1 gunboat sunk	30 killed and wounded 490 captured 2 galleys captured 2 galleys sunk 2 galiots captured 2 galiots sunk 1 gunboat captured

The Battle of Frisches Haff or Battle of Stettiner Haff was a naval battle between Sweden and Prussia that took place 10 September 1759 as part of the ongoing Seven Years' War. The battle took place in the Szczecin Lagoon (German: Stettiner Haff) between Neuwarp and Usedom, and is named after an ambiguous earlier name for the Lagoon, Frisches Haff, which later exclusively denoted the Vistula Lagoon.

Swedish naval forces consisting of 28 vessels and 2,250 men under Captain Lieutenant Carl Rutensparre and Wilhelm von Carpelan destroyed a Prussian force of 13 vessels and 700 men under captain von Köller. The consequence of the battle was that the small fleet Prussia had at its disposal ceased to exist. The loss of naval supremacy meant also that the Prussian positions at Usedom and Wollin became untenable and were occupied by Swedish troops.

== Background ==
At the outbreak of the conflict, Sweden was led by a government dominated by the pro-French Hats party, which felt that this war (mainly aimed against Prussia) was the chance for Sweden to recapture territories lost to Prussia in the past in Pomerania and restore the mouth of the Oder to Swedish control. The chancellor and head of the Hats party, baron Anders Johan von Höpken, sent an army of 14,500 men to Stralsund, capital of Swedish Pomerania, under field-marshal Ungern-Sternberg, with his main mission being the capture of Stettin (today in Poland), which controls the mouths of the Oder.

The Swedes launched a first offensive but were beaten back in Stralsund by the Prussian army under marshal Lehwaldt. Ungern-Sternberg was replaced by count von Rosen, who took no risks and left himself blockaded in Stralsund. However, a Russian offensive in west Prussia forced Lehwaldt to leave Swedish Pomerania on 27 June 1758. Sweden sent reinforcements and a new commander-in-chief, count Hamilton, who profited from Prussian difficulties by going back on the offensive. Although Prussian troops in the area had been heavily denuded to face the Russian threat, they put up a tenacious resistance to the Swedes and battles and skirmishes came one after the other without either of the belligerents able to gain a decisive advantage over the other. The conflict took a naval turn when the Prussians built a fleet at Stettin, by the more or less fortunate transformation of fishing or transport boats into warships, to defy a Swedish squadron supporting their land offensive. Informed of these preparations, the Swedes decided to destroy this fleet.

== Battle ==
At the start of August 1759, the Swedish squadron under Ruthensparre moved into the Oder, moving towards the Stettin lagoon. On 8 August it forced the defences of Peenemünde and penetrated the western half of the lagoon (called Kleines Haff, or Little Lagoon, by the Germans). On 22 August the Swedes won an initial engagement against a fleet under captain von Köller off Anclam. On 10 September, the two fleets again faced each other, near Neuwarp. The Swedish ships commanded by Wilhelm von Carpellan were ranged in 4 lines - in the first were the most powerful ships (four 13-gun galleys armed), then four 5-gun demi-galleys (with mixed sail and oar propulsion), then 3 sloops and 1 ship with howitzers, and finally a line of 13 gunboats. For their part, the Prussians had four galiots and four galleys with 12 cannon each as well as 5 canonnières. Once within range, the Swedes placed themselves in a single line. However, the three Swedish demi-galleys and 9 gunboats sailed towards the south where unidentified sailing vessels had appeared - these turned out to be neutral ships, but this meant these Swedish ships did not take part in the start of the four-hour battle. The battle ended in a heavy Prussian defeat, with their main ships sunk or captured and more than 600 of their sailors captured, for smaller losses (13 killed and 14 wounded) on the Swedish side.

== Aftermath ==
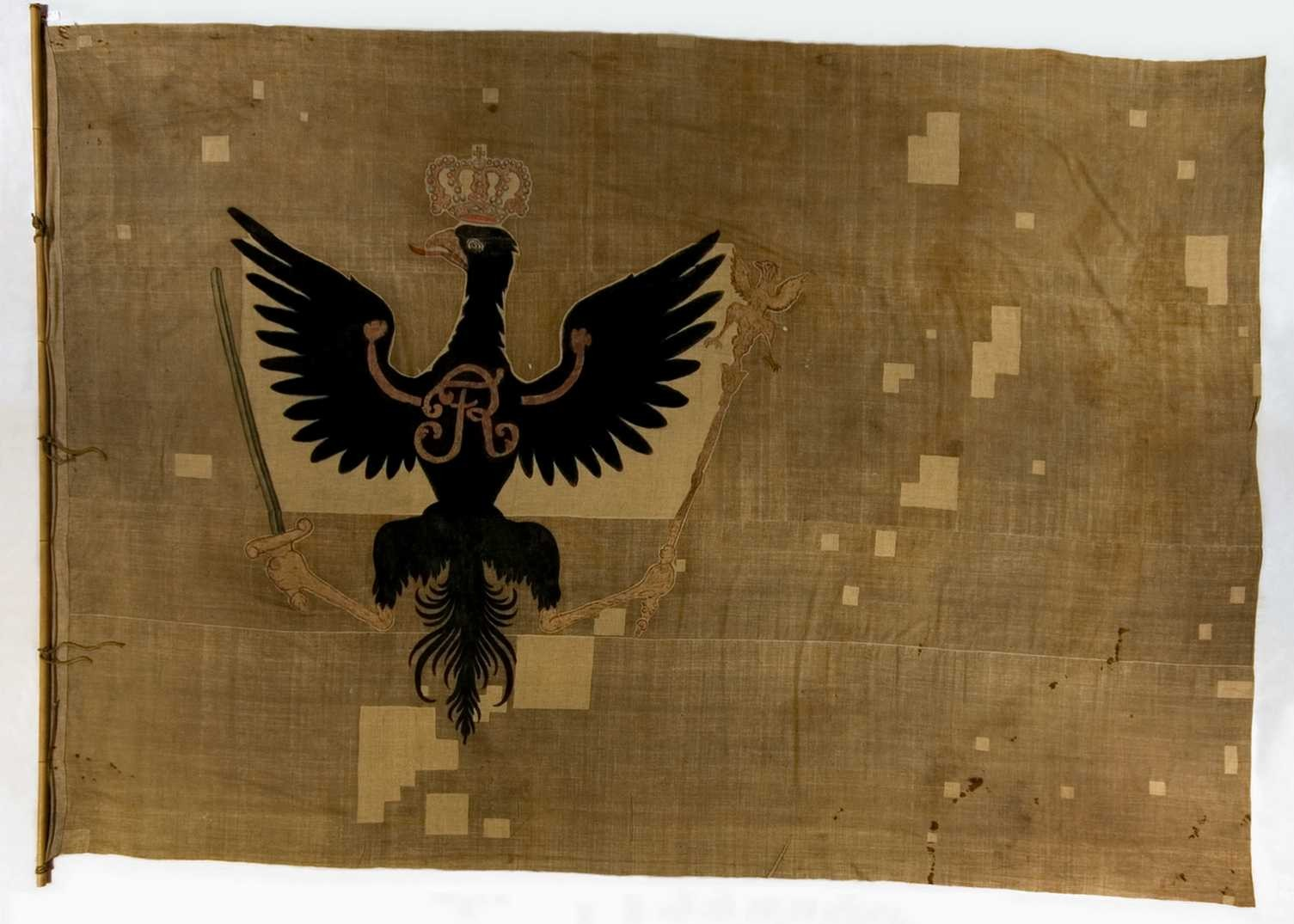
Prussian flag taken as a trophy and today kept in the Swedish Army Museum, Stockholm

The victory guaranteed Swedish control of the lagoon, which they exploited by capturing the island of Wollin. However, their ultimate goal of Stettin remained in Prussian hands. Undaunted, the Prussians began to build a new fleet. The Battle of Frisches Haff was thus a short-lived victory for the Swedes and the Russian retreat from the war of 1762 placed them in a very difficult situation. Realising they did not have a large enough force to hold off the redoubtable troops under king Frederick II of Prussia on their own, the Swedes proposed a peace settlement to him based on a return to the pre-war status quo. Frederick accepted the proposal and formalised it by signing the treaty of Hamburg on 22 May 1762.

== Order of battle ==
- Sweden
  - Carlskrona, galley, 13 cannon
  - Cronoborg, galley, 13 cannon
  - Malmö, galley, 13 cannon
  - Blecking, galley, 13 cannon
  - Svärdfisk, half-galley, 5 cannon
  - Delphin, half-galley, 5 cannon
  - Cabilliou, half-galley, 5 cannon
  - Stor, half-galley, 5 cannon
  - 1 ship armed with howitzers
  - 3 sloops
  - 13 gunboats
- Prussia
  - Kœnig von Preussen, galiot, 14 cannon
  - Prinz von Preussen, galiot, 14 cannon
  - Kœnig Heinrich, galiot, 14 cannon
  - Kœnig Wilhelm, galiot, 14 cannon
  - Jupiter, galley, 11 cannon
  - Mars, galley, 11 cannon
  - Neptunus, galley, 10 cannon
  - Merkurius, galley, 10 cannon
  - 5 gunboats

== Bibliography ==
- Anderson, R. C. (1910). Naval Wars in the Baltic. London: Gilbert-Wood.
- von Mantey, E. (1930). Histoire de la marine allemande (1675–1926) (in French). Paris: Payot.
