= Wilhelm Sebastian von Belling =

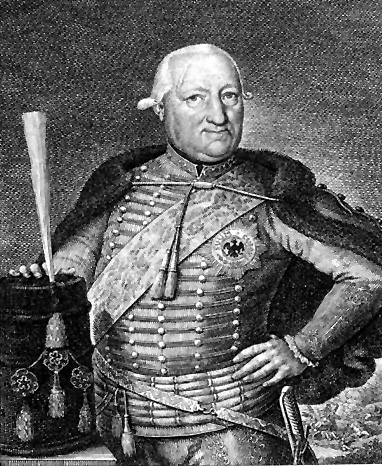
- Belling in 1778–79
- Born: 15 February 1719; Paulsdorf, East Prussia
- Died: 28 November 1779 (aged 60); Stolp, Province of Pomerania
- Military career
- Allegiance: (Kingdom of Prussia) Prussia
- Branch: Army
- Service years: 1737–1779
- Rank: Lieutenant General
- Commands: Belling Hussars
- Conflicts: War of the Austrian Succession; Battle of Mollwitz; Battle of Hohenfriedberg; Siege of Prague; Battle of Kesselsdorf; Seven Years' War; Battle of Neuensund; Battle of Neukalen; Battle of Freiberg; War of the Bavarian Succession
- Awards: Pour le Mérite; Order of the Black Eagle

Wilhelm Sebastian von Belling (15 February 1719 – 28 November 1779) was a Prussian Hussar general under Frederick the Great.

== Biography ==
Belling was born in Paulsdorf, Kingdom of Prussia (modern Pawłowo, Poland) to Lieutenant Colonel Johann Abraham von Belling and Katharina née von Kospoth. He was the grandson of general Johann Georg von Belling.

Belling was educated as a cadet and joined the Prussian Army in 1737. Because of his small body size he was deployed at Kolberg for garrison service only. In 1739 he joined the Prussian Hussars and was removed to the Zieten Hussars in 1741. Throughout the War of the Austrian Succession he fought at the battles of Mollwitz, Hohenfriedberg, Prague and Kesselsdorf.

Belling was awarded the Pour le Mérite in 1757 for his actions in the Seven Years' War. In 1758 he became commander of a newly founded regiment of hussars under Prince Henry of Prussia, the Belling-Hussars. The Belling-Hussars chose "Vincere aut mori" (Victory or death) as their motto and decorated their hats with a depiction of a complete skeleton, a scythe and an hourglass; thus the Belling-Hussars were known as "the whole death" (der ganze Tod).

In the Pomeranian War, on 29 August 1760, the Belling-Hussars captured Gebhard Leberecht von Blücher and Belling, distantly related to Blücher, managed to persuade him to join the Prussian Hussars. In 1761 Belling, commanding a troop of about 5,000 men, successfully delayed the advance of a Swedish Corps of 15,000 men from Swedish Pomerania and their cooperation with the Russian forces in Farther Pomerania. However, in the Battle of Neuensund in the same year, he was defeated by a numerically inferior Swedish force.

In 1776 he was promoted to Lieutenant General and was awarded the Order of the Black Eagle for his role in the War of the Bavarian Succession in 1778.

Belling died in service at his regiment's garrison in Stolp (modern Słupsk, Poland).

Belling was married to Katharine Elisabeth von Grabow; they had one daughter. He is described as a religious and devout Christian, whose evening prayers in times of peace ended:

Thou seest, dear Heavenly Father, the sad plight of thy servant Belling. Grant him soon a nice little war that he may better his condition and continue to praise thy name. Amen

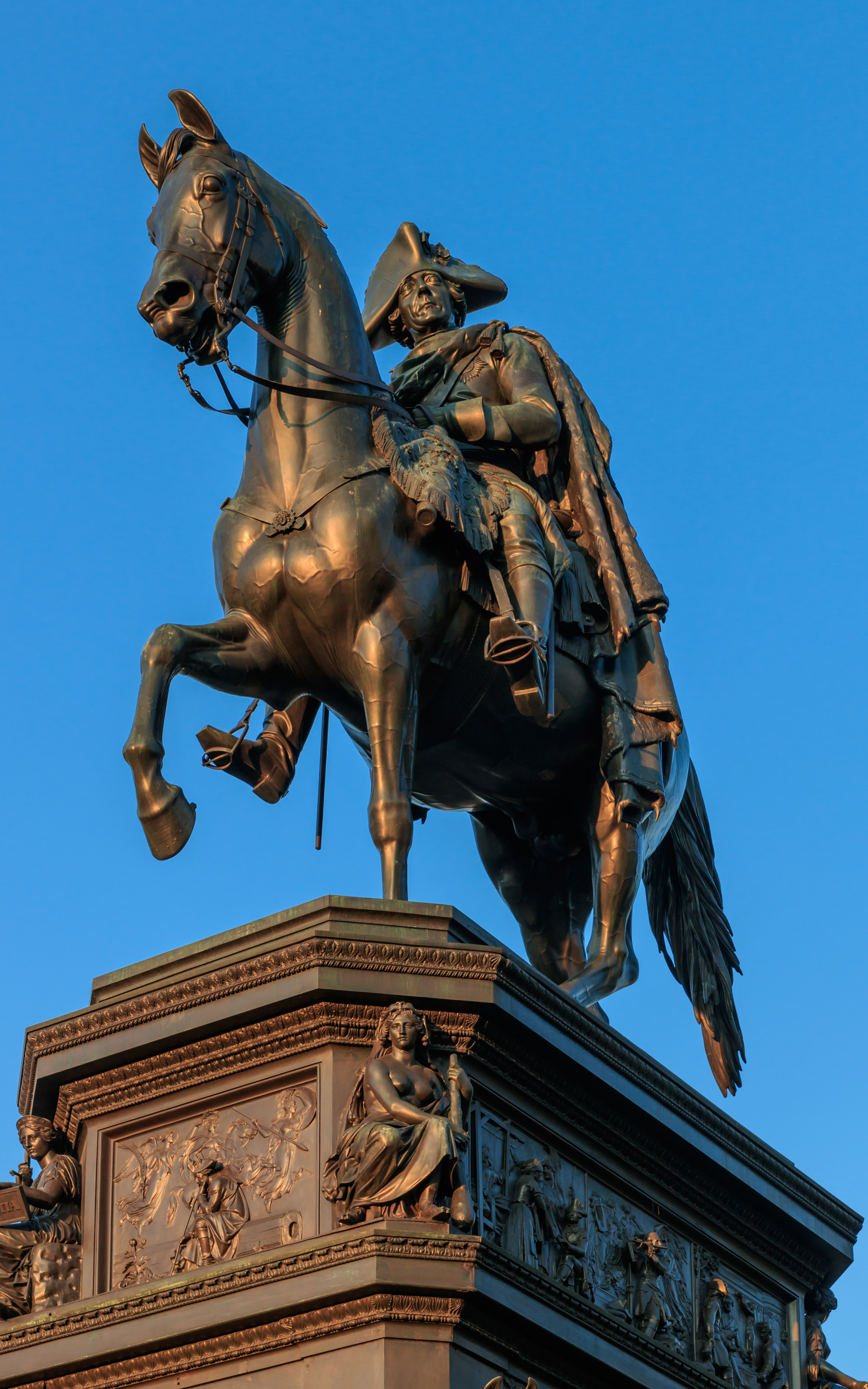
Belling is depicted on the bas-relief of Frederick the Great’s equestrian statue in Berlin
