= Georg Magnus Sprengtporten =

Finnish-Swedish military officer and statesman (1740–1819)

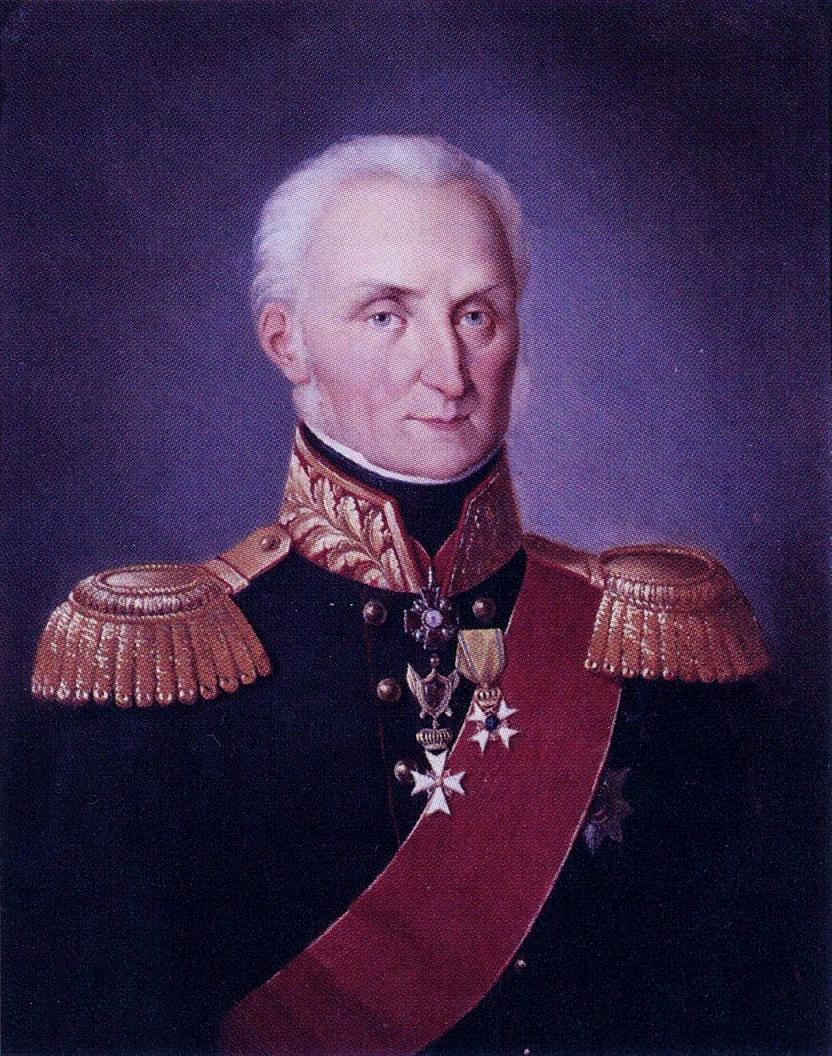
- Portrait by Berndt Godenhjelm

1st Governor-General of Finland
- In office 1 December 1808 – 17 June 1809
- Monarch: Alexander I of Russia
- Preceded by: Office established
- Succeeded by: Michael Andreas Barclay de Tolly

Personal details
- Born: 16 August 1740 (Note: Some older Swedish and Russian genealogies record 16 December 1740 as his date of birth.) Gammelbacka, Porvoo, Kingdom of Sweden
- Died: 13 October 1819 (aged 79) (1 October O.S.) Saint Petersburg, Russian Empire
- Resting place: Smolensky Lutheran Cemetery, Saint Petersburg
- Spouses: Anna Elisabet Glansenstierna (m. 1764; died 1785); Varvara Nikolayevna Samytskaya
- Relations: Jacob Magnus Sprengtporten (half-brother)
- Children: Magnus Wilhelm (1772–1805)

Military service
- Allegiance: Sweden (1752–1786); Russia (1786–1819)
- Rank: General of the Infantry
- Battles/wars: Pomeranian War; Russo-Swedish War (1788–1790); Battle of Porrassalmi; Finnish War

Count Georg Magnus Sprengtporten (Note: Swedish: Göran Magnus Sprengtporten, pronounced [ˈjœːrɑn ˈmɑŋnʉs ˈspreŋːtˌpuːrten]; Russian: Егор Максимович Шпренгпортен, romanized: Yegor Maksimovich Shprengporten, pronounced [jɪˈɡor məkˈsʲiməvʲɪtɕ ʂprʲɪnkˈportʲɪn]; Finnish: Yrjö Maunu Sprengtporten, pronounced [ˈyrjø ˈmɑu̯nu ˈspreŋtpuːrt(ː)en]) (16 August 1740 – 13 October [O.S. 1 October] 1819) was a Finland-Swedish military officer and statesman. He was the younger half-brother of Jacob Magnus Sprengtporten. Following disputes with King Gustav III over military administration, he entered Russian imperial service in 1786 and was appointed the first Governor-General of Finland in 1808. Historically condemned in Sweden as a deserter, he is recognized in Finnish and Russian historiography for his light infantry reforms and his early proposals for an autonomous Grand Duchy of Finland.

== Early life and military career ==
Portrait by Carl Fredrich Brander, 1770

Sprengtporten was born at Gammelbacka manor in Porvoo (Borgå), in the province of Uusimaa, Sweden. He entered the royal army in 1752 and reached the rank of captain during the Pomeranian campaign of the Seven Years' War. In 1772 he assisted his half-brother Jacob Magnus during the revolution of 1772, receiving a promotion to colonel and command of the Savolax Brigade in eastern Finland in 1775.

In Savonia, Sprengtporten altered brigade tactics to emphasize skirmishing, marksmanship, and movement across forested terrain. He introduced a shorter, specialized rifled firearm known as the sprengtportenska studsaren (Sprengtporten carbine). At his estate at Brahelinna (in Ristiina), he ran an unofficial officer training school, financing unit improvements from his personal assets. In August 1780, his training program was formally established as a military school at Tuhkaniemi, Kuopio, before relocating the following May to the Haapaniemi estate in Rantasalmi; this institution later developed into the Hamina Cadet School.

== Political shift and Russian service ==
Sprengtporten's relations with the Swedish crown deteriorated over defense priorities in Finland and compensation for his brigade's expenses. During a visit to Saint Petersburg in 1779, he was received cordially by the imperial court. Between 1779 and 1781 he stayed in Paris, where discussions with Benjamin Franklin turned his attention to American constitutional models and republican federalism.

After returning to Finland in 1781, he explored possibilities for Finnish separation from Sweden through the secret society Valhallaorden and through overtures to the king's brother, Duke Charles of Södermanland (later Charles XIII of Sweden), which were rebuffed. Concluding that separation required foreign assistance, Sprengtporten broke openly with Gustav III at the Riksdag of 1786 while conducting backchannel negotiations with Russian envoys. In September 1786, Empress Catherine the Great accepted him into Russian service with the rank of major general.

== Plans for Finnish statehood ==
In 1786 Sprengtporten drafted a constitutional outline for an independent Finnish republic under Russian protection. The proposal described a federation of provinces with internal administrative autonomy, a legislature composed of the four traditional estates, and an executive state council directed by a lifetime president. Drawing on Dutch and American constitutional precedents, this project formed the earliest documented proposal for an autonomous Finnish state.

== Russo-Swedish War and Bohemian exile ==
During the Russo-Swedish War (1788–1790), Sprengtporten commanded a Russian corps deployed against Swedish lines in eastern Finland. While not among the initial organizers of the Anjala conspiracy, he lobbied Catherine II to provide military backing to the dissident officers. His efforts to turn Finnish regiments against the Swedish crown failed once Gustav III restored discipline within the army. At the Battle of Porrassalmi in June 1789, Sprengtporten was seriously wounded in the lung. Following the war, the Court of Appeal in Turku sentenced him to death for treason in absentia in 1790, while Catherine expressed dissatisfaction with his political influence in Finland.

From 1793 to 1798, Sprengtporten lived in the spa town of Teplice in the Kingdom of Bohemia for medical treatment. During this period, he visited nearby Dux Castle, where he established an intellectual correspondence with Count Joseph Karl von Waldstein's librarian, Giacomo Casanova.

Emperor Paul I returned Sprengtporten to active duty as a general of the infantry. In 1800 Paul sent him to Paris to confer with First Consul Napoleon Bonaparte regarding the status of the Order of Malta and the return of Russian troops captured during the War of the Second Coalition. Sprengtporten concluded arrangements for the release of approximately 7,000 Russian prisoners of war without ransom. After Paul's assassination in 1801, Sprengtporten lived in retirement until early 1808, when Alexander I sought his counsel regarding Swedish military capabilities in Finland.

== Governor-General of Finland ==
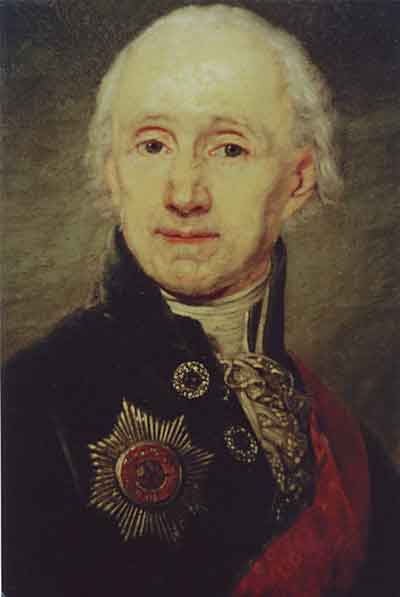
Portrait of Sprengtporten in Russian uniform

Following the outbreak of the Finnish War (1808–1809), Sprengtporten assisted the Russian command with logistical and political assessments. On 1 December 1808, Alexander I named him the first Russian Governor-General of Finland.

Sprengtporten urged the Emperor to convene the Finnish estates to formalize the country's status. At the opening of the Diet of Porvoo in March 1809, he read the sovereign assurance in Swedish confirming Finland's established legal code, Lutheran religion, and estate privileges. Administrative disagreements with the Russian military commander, General Michael Andreas Barclay de Tolly, led Sprengtporten to tender his resignation on 17 June 1809. Alexander accepted the resignation and elevated him to the rank of count in the Finnish nobility on 7 July 1809.

== Later life and memorial ==
Sprengtporten retired to his country estate at Hietala near Vyborg and his home in Saint Petersburg. His son, Magnus Wilhelm, an imperial officer, died in 1805 from wounds suffered at the Battle of Austerlitz. Sprengtporten died in Saint Petersburg in October 1819 and was buried at the Smolensky Lutheran Cemetery.

A memorial of natural granite stones dedicated to Sprengtporten and the founding of the Savolax military school was erected in 1993 at Harbour Park (Satamapuisto), near the Port of Kuopio.

== Notes ==
Political offices
New title	Governor-General of Finland; 1808–1809	Succeeded by Michael Andreas Barclay de Tolly
