= Treaty of Hamburg (1762) =

Treaty between Sweden and Prussia during the Seven Years' War

Original treaty document held in the Swedish National Archives

The Treaty of Hamburg was signed on 22 May 1762 in Hamburg between Sweden and Prussia during the Pomeranian War, a theater of the Seven Years' War.

The treaty came into being after Russia had allied to Prussia on 5 May, making it impossible for Sweden to continue the war which they had entered to regain territories in Pomerania, which they had previously lost. The treaty reaffirmed the pre-war status quo.

== See also ==
- Treaty of Hamburg (1638)
- List of treaties
