= Pomeranian War =

Theater of the Seven Years' War

- Part of the Seven Years' War
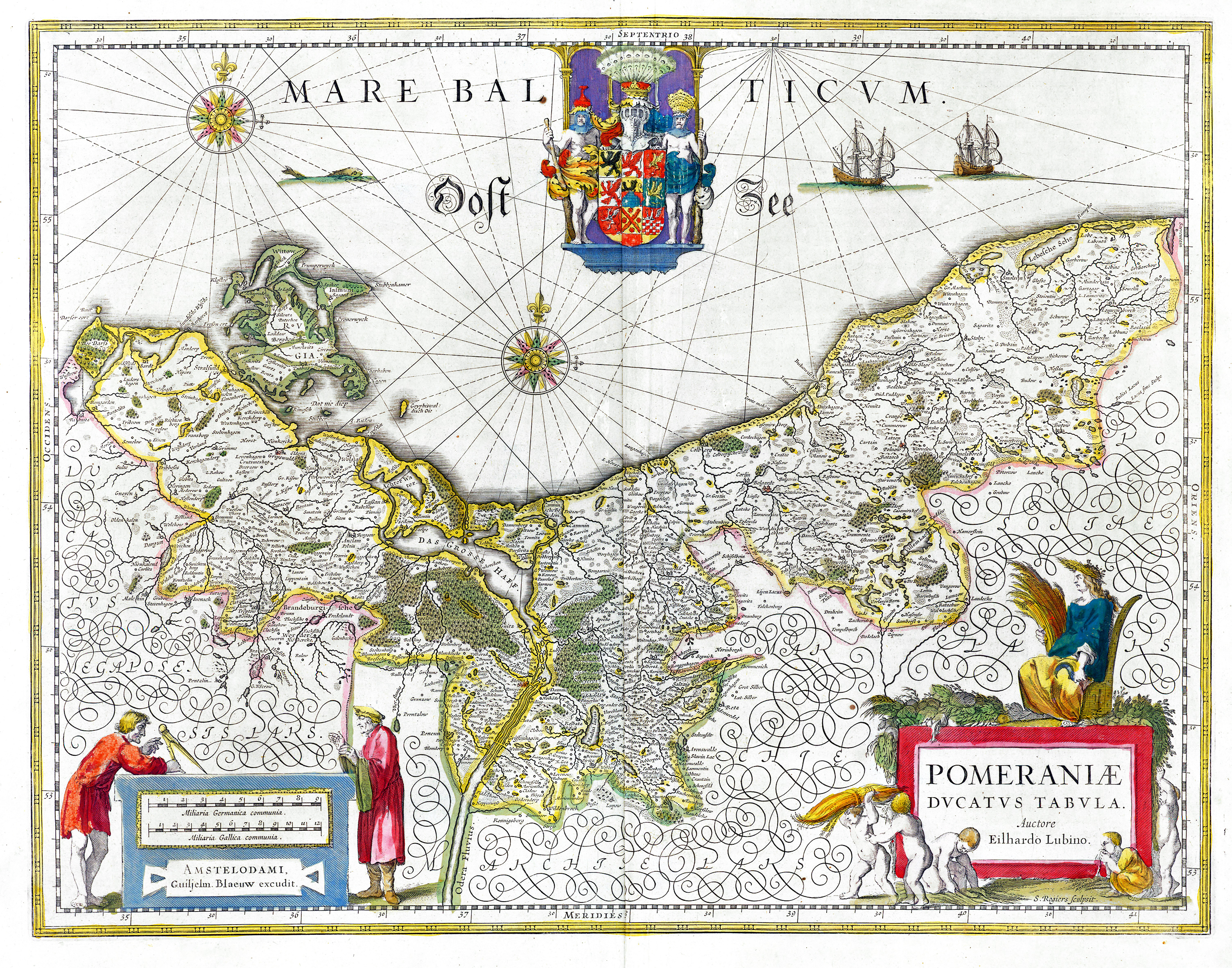
- Map of Pomerania
Date	13 September 1757 – 22 May 1762 (4 years, 8 months, 1 week and 2 days)
Location	Swedish Pomerania, Prussian Pomerania, Brandenburg, Mecklenburg-Schwerin
Result	Prussian victory: Treaty of Hamburg
Territorial changes	Status quo ante bellum

Belligerents
Sweden; Russian Empire	(Kingdom of Prussia) Prussia

Commanders and leaders
(Sweden) Mattias von Ungern-Sternberg (Sweden) Augustin Ehrensvärd (Sweden) Gustaf von Rosen (Sweden) Axel Lagerbielke (Sweden) Gustaf David Hamilton (Russian Empire) Pyotr Rumyantsev (Russian Empire) Ivan Ivanovich Möller-Sakomelsky	(Kingdom of Prussia) Heinrich von Manteuffel (POW) (Kingdom of Prussia) Wilhelm Sebastian von Belling (Kingdom of Prussia) Carl Heinrich von Wedel

Strength
30,000+ in battle 28 ships	25,000+ in battle 13 ships

Casualties and losses
3,473	2,590; 9 ships

The Pomeranian War was a theatre of the Seven Years' War. The term is used to describe the fighting between Sweden and Prussia between 1757 and 1762 in Swedish Pomerania, Prussian Pomerania, northern Brandenburg and eastern Mecklenburg-Schwerin.

The war was characterized by a back-and-forth movement of the Swedish and Prussian armies, neither of whom would score a decisive victory. It started when Swedish forces advanced into Prussian territory in 1757, but were repelled and blockaded at Stralsund until their relief by a Russian force in 1758. In the course of the following, renewed Swedish incursion into Prussian territory, the small Prussian fleet was destroyed and areas as far south as Neuruppin were occupied, yet the campaign was aborted in late 1759 when the undersupplied Swedish forces succeeded neither in taking the major Prussian fortress of Stettin (now Szczecin) nor in combining with their Russian allies.

A Prussian counter-attack of Swedish Pomerania in January 1760 was repelled, and throughout the year Swedish forces again advanced into Prussian territory as far south as Prenzlau before again withdrawing to Swedish Pomerania in the winter. Another Swedish campaign into Prussia started in the summer of 1761, but was soon aborted due to shortage of supplies and equipment. The final encounters of the war took place in the winter of 1761/62 near Malchin and Neukalen in Mecklenburg, just across the Swedish Pomeranian border, before the parties agreed on the Truce of Ribnitz on 7 April 1762. When on 5 May a Russo-Prussian alliance eliminated Swedish hopes for future Russian assistance, and instead posed the threat of a Russian intervention on the Prussian side, Sweden was forced to make peace.

The war was formally ended on 22 May 1762 by the Peace of Hamburg between Prussia, Mecklenburg and Sweden. The hopes of the Swedish Hats party to recover territories lost to Prussia in 1720 were thwarted, and the unpopular and costly war contributed to their subsequent downfall.

== Background ==
The main cause for the Swedish intervention in the Seven Years' War was that the Hats faction then in power in Sweden believed Frederick II of Prussia would succumb to his many enemies, thus affording Sweden a risk-free opportunity to recapture its possessions in Pomerania that it had ceded to Prussia in 1720, towards the end of the Great Northern War. Angered and frightened by the attempted monarchial revolution of 1756, the Hats also wanted to cause Frederick's downfall and to humiliate and destroy the Swedish queen Louisa Ulrika of Prussia, Frederick's sister. The Hats faction was also encouraged to declare war by France, whose wishes were central to the Hats' actions.

Frederick's invasion of Saxony in 1756 was used as a pretext for war, being denounced by both Sweden and France as a violation of the Treaty of Westphalia of 1648, of which they were both guarantors. On March 21, 1757 the governments of France and Austria agreed to a convention in which Sweden and France explained that they had to maintain Germany's freedom in line with the treaty. France promised financial backing for such a war and in June the same year the decision was made to send 20,000 Swedish troops to Germany to emphasise their commitment. On September 13 that force invaded Prussian Pomerania.

To avoid this invasion appearing as a war of aggression (no war of aggression could be started without the consent of the estates), the Swedes issued no declaration of war and presented the incursion to the German parliament as aimed solely at restoring peace. Only after hostilities had begun did the promised financial support from France and its allies arrive and only then, on 22 September 1757, did the Swedish government state its conditions and declare war. However, the Hats had seriously overestimated the strength of the Swedish army, as the soldiers were badly trained, poorly equipped, and in every way unprepared for war.

== Course ==
=== 1757–1758 ===
The Swedish army sent to Germany was only sufficient for taking possession of what had already been conquered by the Allies, but made the all necessary preparations to go on the offensive despite not having the necessary funds. The army's very premise, to suppress Frederick, was found false—on being notified of his victory at Rossbach on 5 November 1757, the Swedish commander Marshal Mattias Alexander von Ungern-Sternberg dared not obey the orders from his government and the French agent Marc René de Montalembert to lead his ill-equipped army in a march on Berlin, instead returning in November 1757 to Swedish Pomerania, where the Swedes were being besieged by the Prussians at Stralsund and Rügen.

Von Ungern-Sternberg relinquished command on 21 December 1757 to Gustaf von Rosen, but von Rosen too was forced to lie idle, blockaded by the Prussians. This blockade was lifted by an invading Russian army on 18 June 1758, but von Rosen had grown tired of his thankless task and handed command over to Gustaf David Hamilton. Augustin Ehrensvärd captured Peenemünde hill on July 27, and Hamilton sent 16,000 men to support the Russians, who were besieging Küstrin. However, after their defeat at Zorndorf he decided instead to march to Saxony to join up with the Austrians. However, he got no further than Neuruppin in Brandenburg, which was reached on 22 September. A detachment he sent from there suffered a heavy defeat on 26 September at the Battle of Tornow, but Major Carl Constantin De Carnall was able to reach Fehrbellin with 800 men to defend it from about 5,000 Prussians at a battle fought there on 28 September.

After the failure of the Austrian invasion of Saxony, Hamilton left Neuruppin on 10 October and headed for the River Oder, in the hopes of joining up with the Russians. He failed in this and the Swedish force had to go into winter quarters, with Hamilton returning to Swedish Pomerania. The government blamed him for the force's failure and pressured him into resigning his command, which Hamilton did on 23 November 1758. Hamilton was replaced as commander on 19 December the same year with Jacob Albrecht von Lantingshausen.

=== 1759 ===
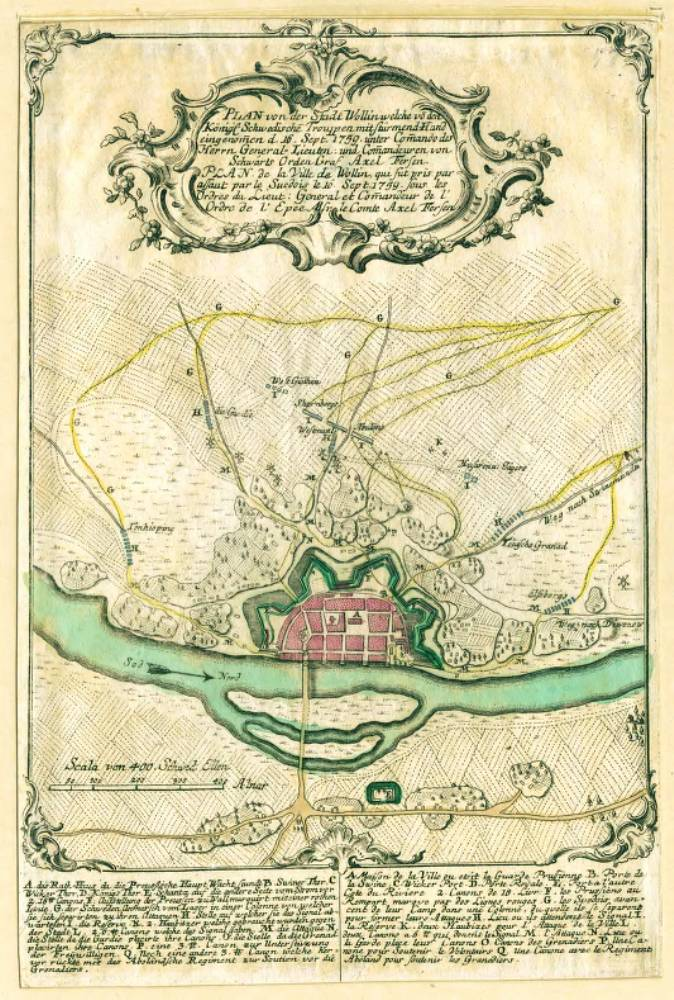
Contemporary plan showing the conquest of Wollin by Axel von Fersen in 1759

Early in 1759, a superior Prussian force forced him to retreat to Stralsund, losing the garrisons at Demmin, Anklam and Peenemünde after hard fighting. The Russian advance in May liberated Swedish Pomerania, but lack of money and supplies meant the Swedish commander could only start campaigning that August. His goal was to besiege Stettin and in preparation for this Lantingshausen allowed Axel von Fersen to take 4,000 men to capture Usedom and Wollin—this objective was met after the Battle of Frisches Haff ensured Swedish naval supremacy in September—while Lantingshausen took the main body of the army to advance deep into Prussian Pomerania, where he then remained still for a long while. However, due to a lack of cooperation from his allies, he was unable to besiege Stettin and in late autumn withdrew into Swedish Pomerania.

=== 1760–1762 ===
The Prussians then invaded Swedish Pomerania on 20 January 1760, but this time they were repulsed and on 28 January Swedish troops penetrated as far as Anklam and captured the Prussian general Heinrich von Manteuffel. However, despite these successes and despite the Prussian army's attention mainly being elsewhere, Lantingshausen and his 15,000 troops were under-supplied and only able to invade Prussia in August, mainly in order to find supplies. He pushed forward to Prenzlow (now Prenzlau) in Brandenburg with his main force of 6,000 troops, leaving Augustin Ehrensvärd with a detachment in Pasewalk. There he was attacked by the enemy and fought back bravely, but Ehrensvärd was wounded and had to resign his command.

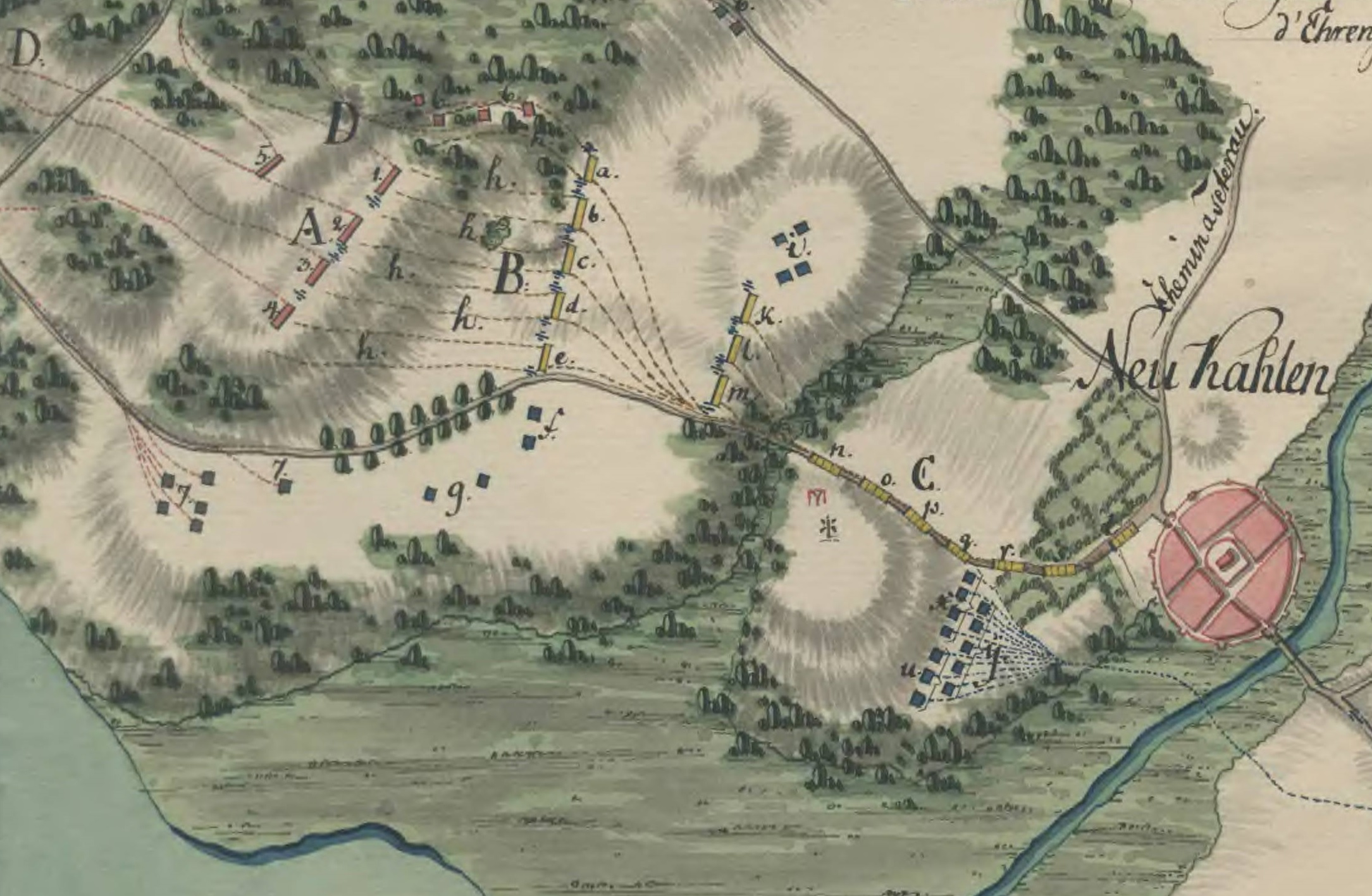
Plan of the Battle of Neukalen

Then many officers left to participate in parliament and the resulting shortage of officers forced Lantingshausen to return to Swedish Pomerania, where he remained for the whole winter without being attacked by the Prussians. Although his commands exceeded any expectations, Lantingshausen tired of the immense difficulties and in June 1761 resigned. Only in July was his successor Augustin Ehrensvärd able to raise 7,000 men to invade the enemy's country. Although superior to the Prussian army that tried to prevent his advance, they were so poorly equipped that the advance did not get far and the campaign saw only minor engagements. In September he sent two regiments under count Frederick William von Hessenstein to support the Russians, who had been besieging Kolberg since 1759. However, Hessenstein soon had to withdraw and in October the whole Swedish force returned to Swedish Pomerania. When the Prussians began to worry about their borders, he sent Jacob Magnus Sprengtporten with light troops (the so-called Sprengtportenska) to Mecklenburg and on 23 December defeated a Prussian force at Malchin on 23 December. However, there he was surrounded by a superior Prussian force, though Ehrensvärd was able to break through and rescue him. An advance guard under De Carnall defeated the Prussians at Neukalen (2 January 1762) who were trying to block the road and Ehrensvärd marched into Malchin. However, he then immediately returned to Swedish Pomerania and on 7 April came to a truce on his own initiative—this truce of Ribnitz lasted until the peace.

== Results ==
In Sweden, the unpopularity of this costly and futile war meant that the Hats' control on government began to falter and the confusion the war caused led to a deficit which resulted in their fall in 1765. The death of Elizabeth of Russia in January 1762 changed the whole political situation in Europe. A Russo-Prussian alliance, formalized on 5 May, threatened to make Russia an enemy not an ally of Sweden. The secret committee thus decided on March 13 that year that Sweden would seek a separate peace. Via the queen's mediation, the Swedes signed the peace of Hamburg with Prussia and Mecklenburg on 22 May, accepting their defeat—Prussia and Sweden were restored to the status quo ante bellum.
