= Neukalen =

Town in Mecklenburg-Vorpommern, Germany

- Town
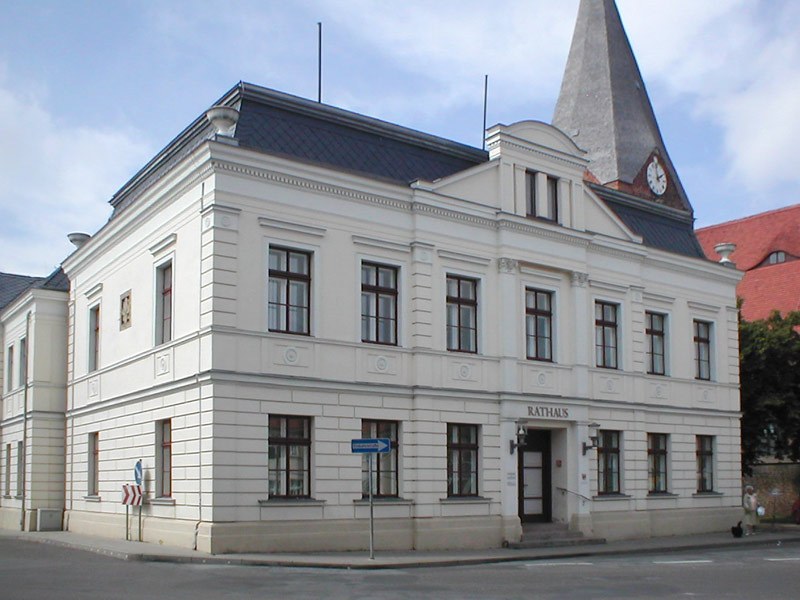
- Town hall

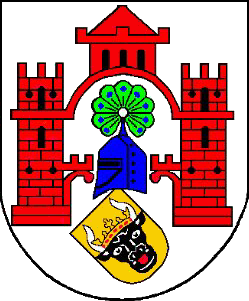
- Coat of arms

- Location of Neukalen within Mecklenburgische Seenplatte district
- Interactive map of Neukalen
- Location within Germany Location within Mecklenburg-Vorpommern
- Coordinates: 53°49′N 12°47′E
- Country: Germany
- State: Mecklenburg-Vorpommern
- District: Mecklenburgische Seenplatte
- Municipal assoc.: Malchin am Kummerower See
- Subdivisions: 8

Government
  - Mayor: Willi Voß

Area
  - Total: 47.97 km^{2} (18.52 sq mi)
- Elevation: 3 m (9.8 ft)

Population (2025-12-31)
  - Total: 1,766
  - Density: 36.81/km^{2} (95.35/sq mi)
- Time zone: UTC+01:00 (CET)
  - Summer (DST): UTC+02:00 (CEST)
- Postal codes: 17154
- Dialling codes: 039956
- Vehicle registration: DM
- Website: http://www.stadt-neukalen.de

Neukalen (German pronunciation: [nɔʏˈkaːlən], lit. 'New Kalen', in contrast to "Old Kalen") is a town in the Mecklenburgische Seenplatte district, in Mecklenburg-Western Pomerania, Germany. It is situated 19 km southwest of Demmin.

== History ==
(Old) Kalen was first mentioned in a document of 1174. After 1236, Kalen, now called Altkalen, was located on the trade route from Stettin (now Szczecin) to Rostock and it expanded as a city with a strong fortification. The city got lands and in 1253 it was granted the Lübeck law. In 1281 the city was moved for unknown reasons to Gnoien and so Neukalen was newly founded in 1281.

== Personalities ==
- Anke Borchmann (born 1954), rower, Olympic and double world champion
