= General Manteuffel =

General Manteuffel may refer to:

- Edwin Freiherr von Manteuffel (1809–1885), Prussian general during the Franco-Prussian War
- Hasso von Manteuffel (1897–1978), German general during World War II
- Heinrich von Manteuffel (1696–1798), Prussian lieutenant general in Wars of Frederick the Great
