= Moritz Franz Kasimir von Wobersnow =

Prussian major general of infantry

Moritz Franz Kasimir von Wobersnow (5 March 1708 in Kamissow–23 July 1759 at Kay) was a Prussian major general of infantry and a general-adjutant of Frederick the Great. He died at the Battle of Kay; a lifelong friend of the King, his name is included on the Equestrian statue of Frederick the Great.

== Family ==
Moritz Franz Kasimir came from the old Pomeranian noble family of Wobersnow. He was a son of Moritz Georg von Wobersnow (1677–1759), heredity lord of Kamissow and his wife, Anne Elisabeth, née Manteuffel, of the House of Popelow.

== Military service ==
In 1723, Wobersnow entered the Prussian military service in the infantry regiment "Grumkow" as a fahnenjunker. With Crown Prince Frederick, he transferred to the regiment Moulin, where he remained for the remainder of the reign of Frederick William II and for the first seven years of Frederick's reign, through the War of Austrian Succession. He was promoted to major in 1747. In August 1751, he received for his service a prebendary to the cathedral in Minden, which gave him a regular income. In March 1752 he was promoted to lieutenant colonel and appointed to the adjutant to the king. He was also given control of the light Jaeger Corps. He also accompanied the king to his campaign to Saxony.

=== Seven Years' War ===
He was wounded in the Battle of Prague, but soon recovered to fight at the battles of Rossbach and Leuthen. Frederick sent him and his light troops to support Christoph von Dohna against the Russians. In August 1758 he fought in the Battle of Zorndorf and helped to expel the Russians from Landsberg an der Warthe (Gorzów Wielkopolski) in September.

In February 1759 he received his own corps; he and Georg Ludwig von Puttkamer moved from Silesia to Poland, where they were commissioned to destroy Russian magazines. In June 1759, as the Russians, however, shifted their forces to western Poland, and marched toward the Oder river, a move that threatened the Prussian heartland, Brandenburg, and potentially Berlin. Frederick sent an army corps commanded by Friedrich August von Finck to contain the Russians; he sent a second column commanded by Christoph II von Dohna to support Finck. Wobersnow was at the vanguard of the second column. At Battle of Kay, in an effort to break the Russian line, Wobersnow led eight battalions and six squadrons from Züllichau against the Russian right wing. His cavalry penetrated the enemy's infantry line, but the Russian cavalry, supported by gun-fire, drove them back. He fell in the Kay on 23 July 1759.
