= Heinrich von Manteuffel =

Prussian lieutenant general

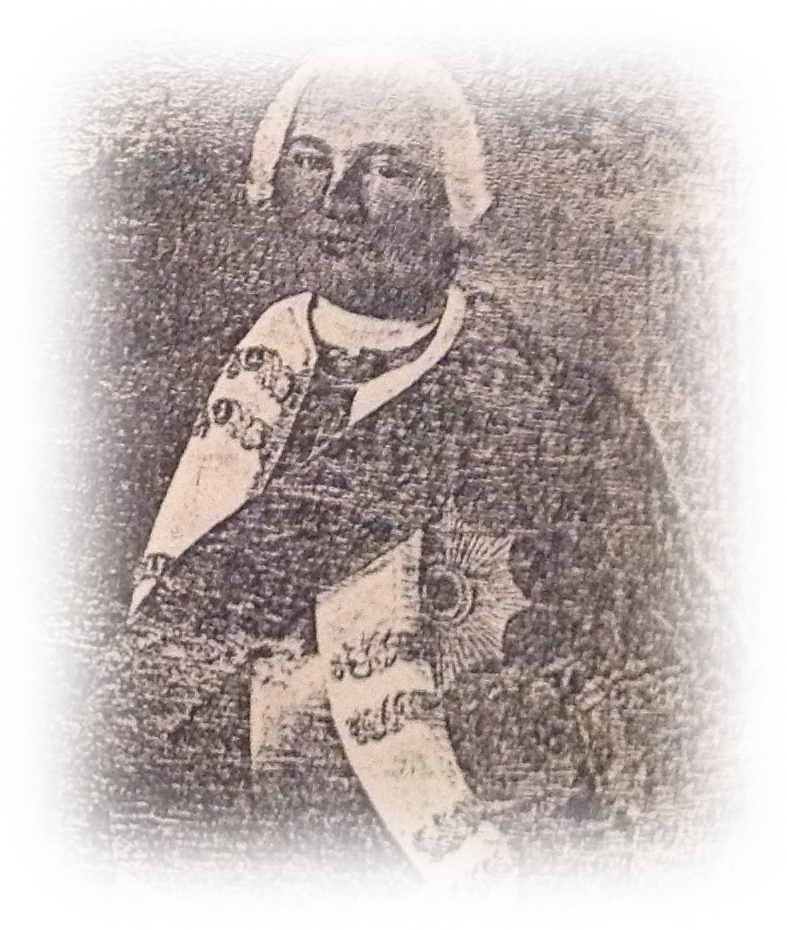
- Lt. General Heinrich von Manteuffel
- Born: 7 November 1696; Groß-Poplow, Pomerania
- Died: 10 July 1778 (aged 81); Belgard Farther Pomerania
- Military career
- Allegiance: (Kingdom of Prussia) Prussia
- Branch: Army
- Service years: 1713–1778
- Rank: Lieutenant General
- Conflicts: First Silesian War; Second Silesian War; Seven Years' War; Pomeranian War
- Awards: Pour le Mérite; Order of the Black Eagle; Equestrian statue of Frederick the Great 1851

Heinrich von Manteuffel (7 November 1696 – 10 July 1778), was a Prussian lieutenant general. He participated in the Pomeranian campaign of 1715 and the first two of Frederick's Silesian wars, was wounded at Chotusitz, and commanded an infantry regiment at the beginning of the Seven Years' War. He received the Order of the Black Eagle, the Order Pour le Merite and his name is inscribed on the Equestrian statue of Frederick the Great.

== Family ==
Heinrich Manteuffel was born in Groß-Poplow, Pomerania (Popielewo) on 7 November 1696, the son of Ewald von Manteuffel (1645–1723) and Sophie von Kameke (died 26 July 1699). He joined the Prussian military as a young man. Manteuffel's military career modeled that of other Junker sons. Many of the Junkers owned immense estates, especially in the north-eastern half of Germany (i.e. the Prussian provinces of Brandenburg, Pomerania, Silesia, West Prussia, East Prussia and Posen)). Their younger sons followed careers as soldiers (Fahnenjunker) (the Junkers controlled the Prussian Army).

== Career ==
Manteuffel joined the Prussian military in 1713 as a Fahnenjunker in the 24th Regiment. He advanced through the ranks, seeing action under command of Kurt Christoph Graf von Schwerin. Throughout his career, he demonstrated a cool head even in the heat of battle; at the Battle of Prague, he showed considerable courage in picking up the fallen regimental flag, handing it to a Junker to carry, and leading his regiment forward despite intensive cannon fire.

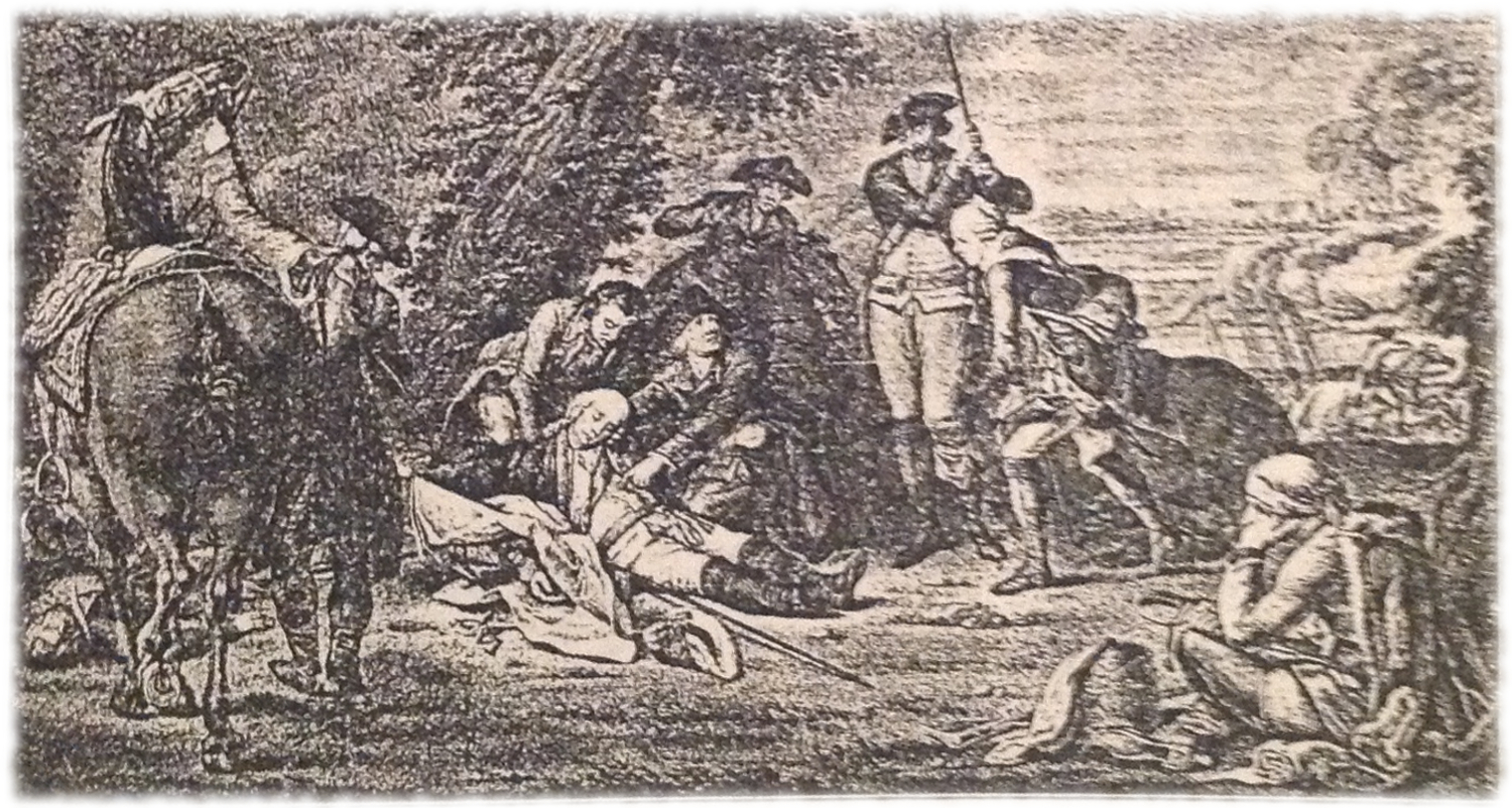
Manteuffel and Schwerin at the Battle of Prague. Manteuffel picked up the colors and led the regiment to victory.

Promotions

- Junker: 1713
- Gefreiten/Corporal: 1 July 1716
- Fahnrich: 1 February 1793
- 2nd Lieutenant: 1720
- Adjutant: 1721
- 1st Lieutenant: 7 June 1723
- Staff Captain: 1734
- Major: 1743
- Lt Colonel: 1744
- Colonel (Regiment # 17): 1746
- Major General: 1756
- Lt. General: 1758

In September 1757 he received the supreme command of all Pomeranian troops. Towards the end of the year, the Swedish Feldmarschall Lehwaldt Hülfe was confined to Stralsund. When, the following year, the Duke of Bevern became governor of Stettin, Manteuffel again received the supreme command of troops in Pomerania when Christoph II von Dohna marched to Saxony in November; even when Dohna had returned from Saxony, Manteuffel retained his independence; the king expressly instructed Dohna to avail himself of Manteuffel's council.

In the spring of 1759, when Dohna went to Berlin to recuperate from illness, Manteuffel assumed Dohna's command. In the middle of May, Manteuffel led the greater part of the troops to Stargard against the Russians. Here Dohna, now advised by Moritz Franz Kasimir von Wobersnow, resumed command briefly. Manteuffel fought at the Battle of Kay on 23 July 1759, and was wounded there while trying to break the Russian right flank; later, in Berlin, he was ordered to form a corps with which he was to expel the Swedes from the Prussian territory. In January 1760 he attempted to push the enemy back, he was attacked and wounded on the 28th of that month in the early morning hours at Anklam, while he and his troops engaged in hand-to-hand combat with the Swedes. An armistice of Ribnitz, concluded on 7 April 1762, ended the Pomeranian War. His injuries, though, proved sufficient to retire. He went to his estate Collatz in the district of Belgard in Hinterpommern, where he died on 10 July 1778.

In February 1759, Frederick awarded him the Order of the Black Eagle. In 1851, his name was included on the Equestrian statue of Frederick the Great.
