= Gładysze =

- Village
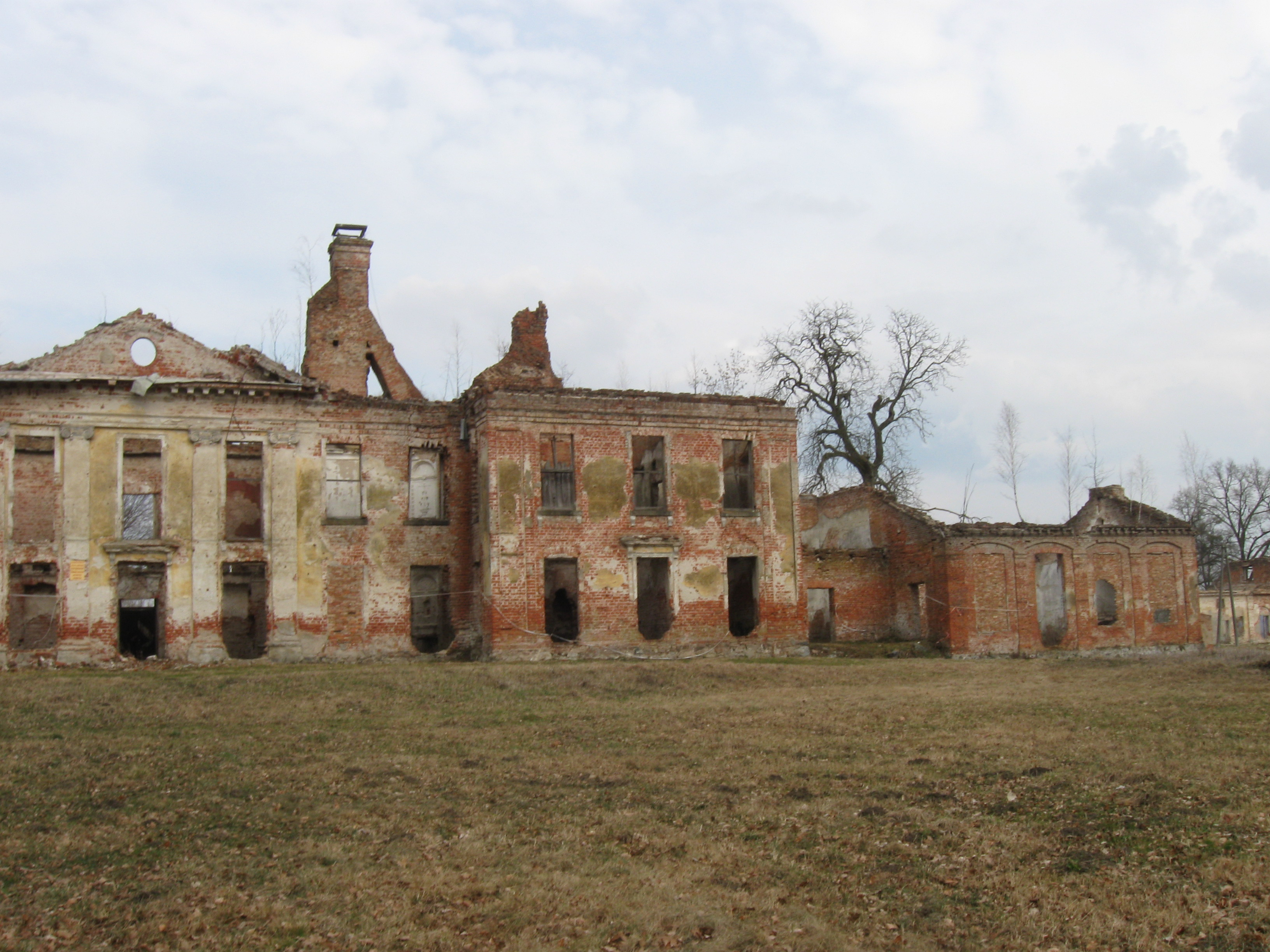
- Palace ruins (2010)

- Location within Poland
- Coordinates: 54°9′N 19°55′E
- Country: Poland
- Voivodeship: Warmian-Masurian
- County: Braniewo
- Gmina: Wilczęta
- Population: 314

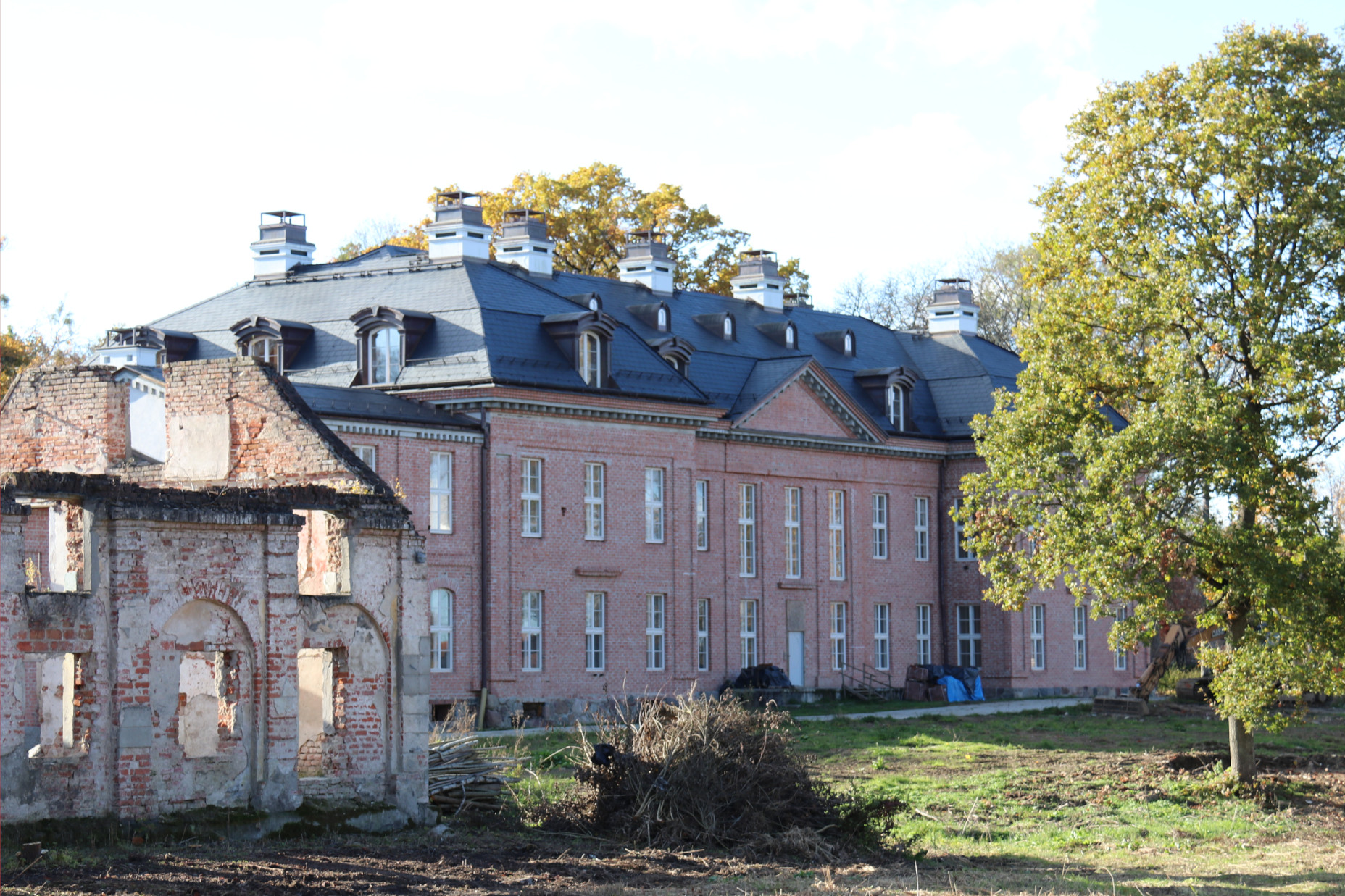
Palace Schlodien, reconstruction 2024

Gładysze [ɡwaˈdɨʂɛ] is a village in the administrative district of Gmina Wilczęta, within Braniewo County, Warmian-Masurian Voivodeship, in northern Poland.

== History ==
The village was first mentioned as Schklodien or Sklodien, a name of Old Prussian origin, that probably refers to the initial owner "Sklode", which is an Old Prussian name. The village was the property of the von Werner family until 1643, when the area was bought by a member of the Dohna family and remained within this family up to 1945. Christoph I. zu Dohna-Schlodien inherited the village in 1688 and decided to build a representative palace. He employed Jean de Bodt with the construction, which was erected in 1701-1704.

In 1802 Carl Ludwig zu Dohna-Schlodien voluntarily released the local peasants out of the traditional subservience. In 1809 the later Prussian Kings Frederick William IV of Prussia and Wilhelm estivated at Schlodien as well as Max von Schenkendorf in 1813/14.

At the end of World War II the Palace was plundered by the Red Army throughout the East Prussian Offensive in early 1945. The area became part of Poland and the Palace was used as a grain storehouse and later unused. In 1986 the Palace burnt down, today only ruins are left.

== Notable residents ==
- Christoph I. zu Dohna-Schlodien (1665–1733), Prussian general and diplomat
- Christoph II von Dohna (1702–1762), Prussian general
