= Popielewo, Świdwin County =

Popielewo
- Village
- Location within Poland
- Coordinates: 53°45′N 16°10′E
- Country: Poland
- Voivodeship: West Pomeranian
- County: Świdwin
- Gmina: Połczyn-Zdrój

Popielewo [pɔpjɛˈlɛvɔ] (German: Gross Poplow) is a village in the administrative district of Gmina Połczyn-Zdrój, within Świdwin County, West Pomeranian Voivodeship, in north-western Poland. It lies approximately 5 km (3 mi) south-east of Połczyn-Zdrój, 27 km (17 mi) east of Świdwin, and 111 km (69 mi) east of the regional capital Szczecin.

== Notable residents ==
- Heinrich von Manteuffel (7 November 1696 – 10 July 1778), Prussian general

== See also ==
- History of Pomerania
