= Battle of Kay =

Battle in the 7 years' war

Coordinates: 52°06′00″N 15°32′00″E

- Part of the Third Silesian War
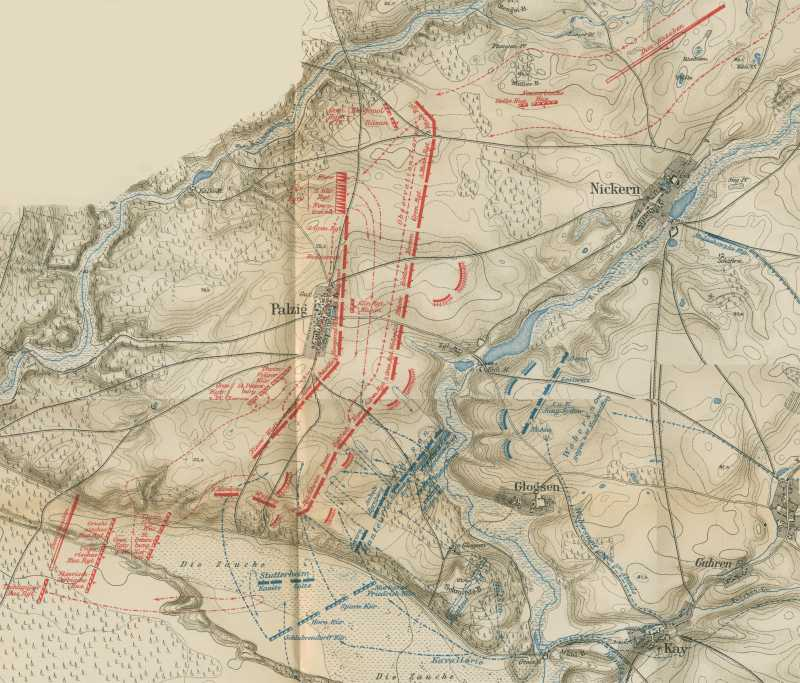
- Map of the battle of Kay
Date	23 July 1759 (Note: Julian cal.: 12 July 1759)
Location	Kay, Margraviate of Brandenburg
Result	Russian victory

Belligerents
Russia	(Kingdom of Prussia) Prussia

Commanders and leaders
Pyotr Saltykov	(Kingdom of Prussia) Carl Heinrich von Wedel (Kingdom of Prussia) Moritz Franz Kasimir von Wobersnow † (Kingdom of Prussia) Heinrich von Manteuffel (WIA)

Strength
40,000–41,000 (Note: c. 40,000; 40,500; c. 41,000 (Note: Dowling: "Some estimates place his army as high as 70,000 men; others suggest he had approximately 41,000 in June and July."))	26,000–28,000 (Note: 26,000; up to 27,500; 28,000)

Casualties and losses
4,700–5,000 (Note: 4,700; 4,804; c. 5,000)	7,000–8,300 (Note: 7,000+; 7,669; 8,000; up to 8,300)

The Battle of Kay (German: Schlacht bei Kay), also referred to as the Battle of Sulechów, Battle of Züllichau, or Battle of Paltzig, was an engagement fought on 23 July 1759 during the Seven Years' War. It occurred near Kay (Kije) in the Neumark, now part of Poland.

General Carl Heinrich von Wedel, the commander of the Prussian army of 26,000–28,000 men, attacked a larger Russian army of 40,000–41,000 men commanded by Count Pyotr Saltykov. The Prussians lost in the region of 7,669 men; the Russians lost around 4,804. After the battle, King Frederick II of Prussia was determined to force the Russians into a decisive engagement in order to prevent them joining up with the main Austrian army. Three weeks later, the Prussians met the combined Russian-Austrian army at Kunersdorf.

== Situation in the Seven Years' War ==
By 1759, Prussia had reached a strategic defensive position in the war. Upon leaving winter quarters in April 1759, Frederick assembled his army in Lower Silesia; this forced the main Habsburg army to remain in its winter staging position in Bohemia. The Russians, however, shifted their forces into western Poland and marched westward toward the Oder river, a move that threatened the Prussian heartland, Brandenburg, and potentially Berlin itself. Frederick countered by sending an army corps commanded by Friedrich August von Finck to contain the Russians; he sent a second column commanded by Christoph II von Dohna to support Finck.

The Austrian and Russian goal was twofold. The Austrians had advanced to the northern Bohemian frontier river Queis (Kwisa), the frontier between Lusatia and Silesia, and occupied a 15-kilometer (9.3 mi) of the frontier between Austria and Prussia in Silesia. From there, Leopold Joseph von Daun could cross into either Lusatia or Silesia, as needed. The Allies held a council of war on 8 July, and Saltykov pressed for a crossing into Silesia. Daun was still reluctant to do so, but he did send Ernst Gideon von Laudon with the auxiliary corps. Part of Daun's reluctance was based on what Frederick and his brother, Henry, might do.

Frederick left his encampment near Landeshut on 4 July and marched north west toward Lowenberg, 20 km (12 mi) east of Daun's position on 10 July. At the same time, his brother marched with the main army from Saxony to Sagan, in Silesia. This effectively separated Daun from Saltykov. Knowing, though, that Loudon's corps was not sufficient to fully support the Russian ally, he sent also Count András Hadik's 17,000-man observation corps from northern Bohemia. This corps had been shadowing Henry's army and Hadik broke off his contact with Henry's force on 22 July, crossing into Lusatia at Zwickau.

== Dispositions ==
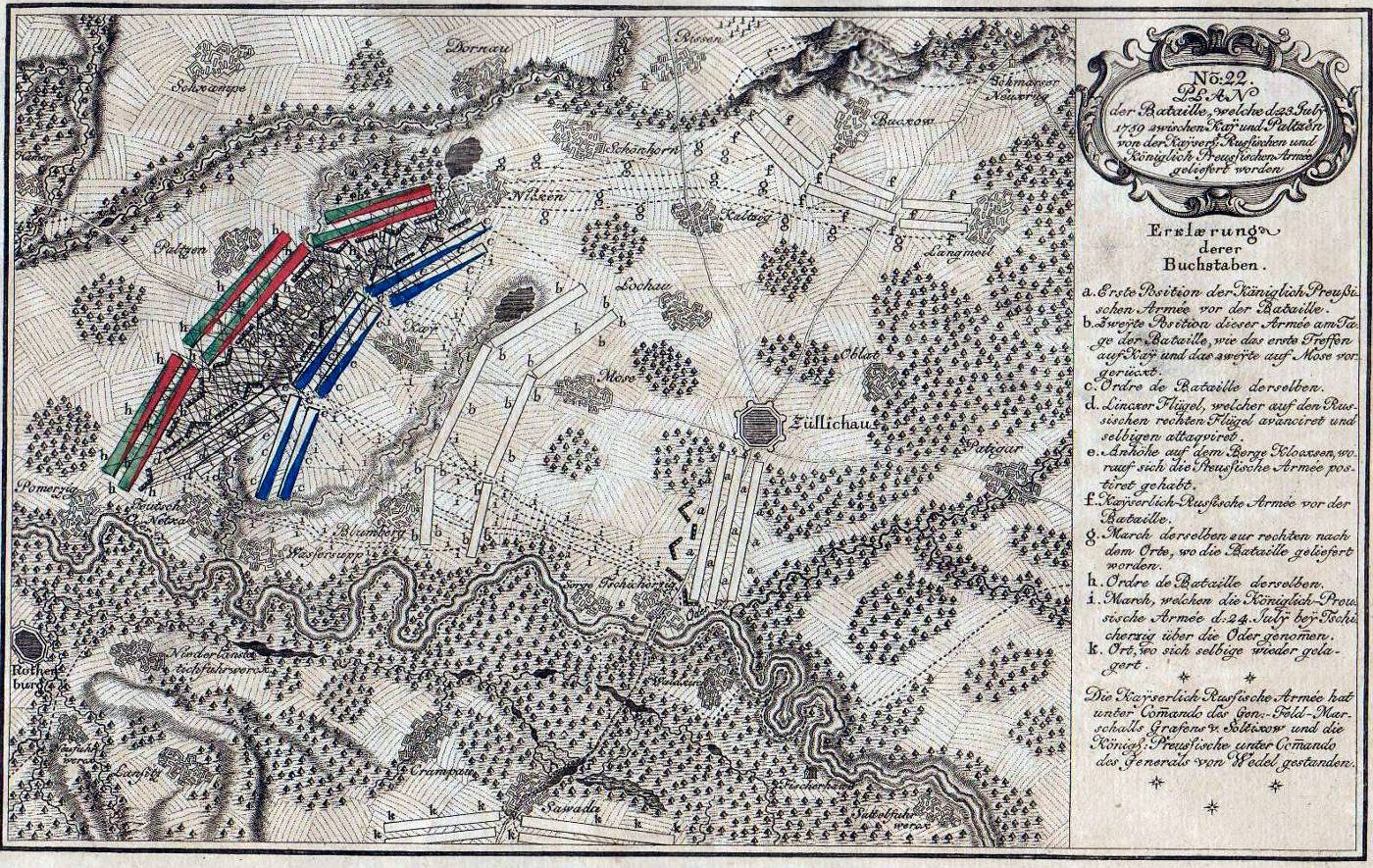
Battlefield at Kay (Paltzig) showing advance of the Prussian forces against the Paltig heights

Upon orders from Empress Elizabeth, Saltykov moved on Prussia in a methodical advance beginning in June 1759. Some estimates place his army as high as 70,000 men; others suggest he had approximately 41,000 in June and July. Upon learning of this advance, Frederick ordered General Dohna to halt the Russian westward advance. Dohna had a force of 26,000 at his disposal, including several companies of cavalry.

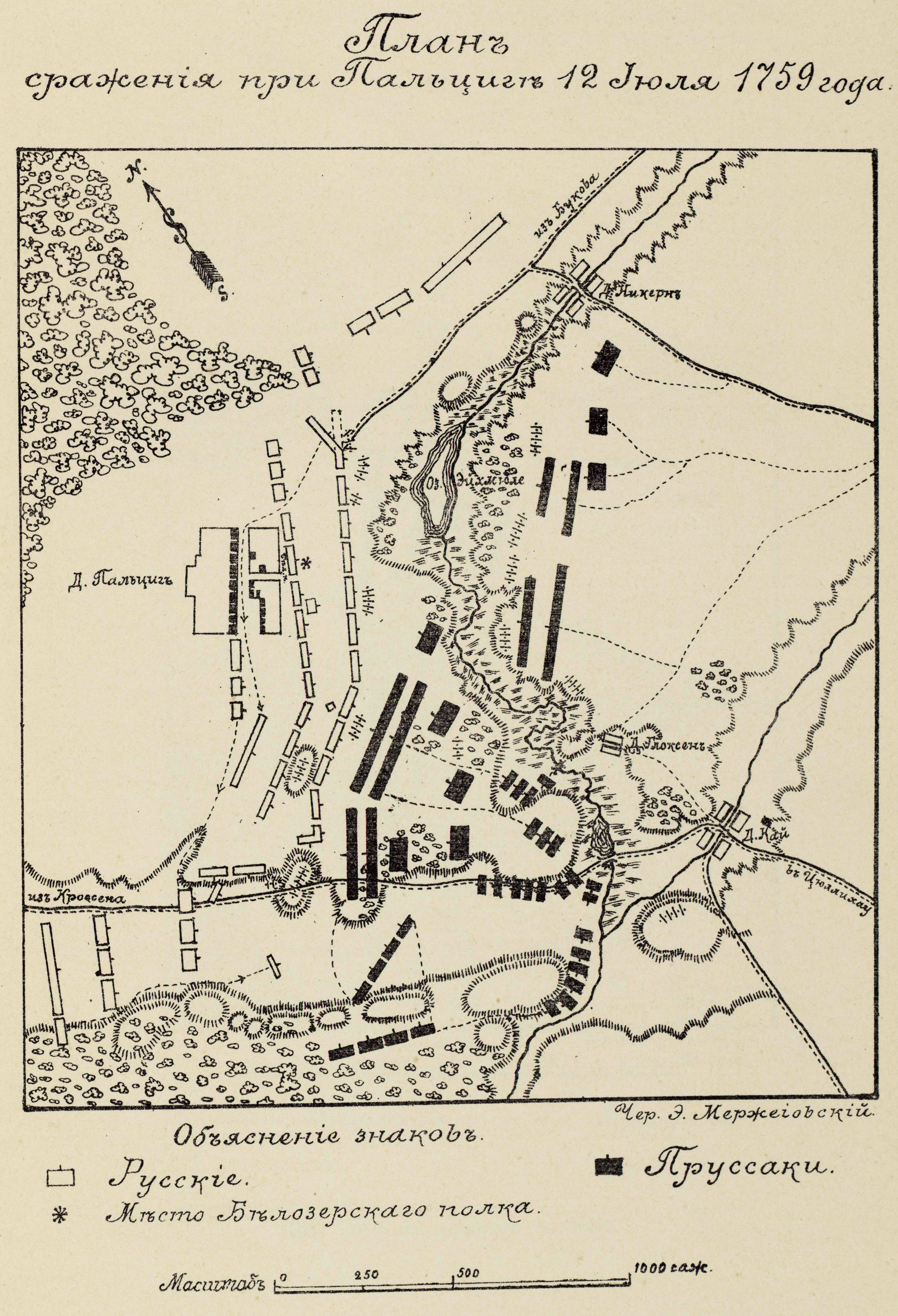
Whites are Russians and blacks are Prussians

In mid-July, Dohna and Saltykov spent a week feinting with each other as Saltykov drew closer to the Prussian border. On 14 July, he turned southwest, making for the Oder river, somewhere between Crossen and Glogau. By 19 July, he had reached the Silesian front near Züllichau (Sulechów), where Saltykov planned to rest his troops for a couple of days. The third commander of the Russian force in three years, he was still relatively new to the command of this army, and spent a couple of days consulting with his chief officers and getting to know the strengths and weaknesses of his army, and letting them get to know him. In a course of meetings with his staff, however, he excluded the Austrian commanders with him, a telling comment on his distrust of the Habsburg staff.

Monitoring this from afar, and dissatisfied with Dohna's timidity in bringing Saltykov to battle, Frederick sent Carl Heinrich von Wedel to take command. Wedel arrived on 20 July and established a blocking position at Züllichau. This would prevent the Russians from entering Prussian territory and reaching the Oder. He wanted to attack the Russians at dawn the next day, but could not find an appropriately weak location in the Russian defenses.

On the same day as Wedel arrived, 20 July, Saltykov established himself astride the Prussian communication line at the Oder, strengthening his already formidable position. This effectively cut any Prussian advance or reinforcement from Crossen (Krosno) or Frankfurt on the Oder. At this point, the Russians occupied the heights by Kay and additional high ground by Mosau (Mozów). A stream, the Eichmühlen Fliess, flowed in a swampy depression just to the east of the town. It could be crossed only at a single narrow point on the road east of Kay, directly opposite the Russian center; a second crossing could be made immediately south of Kay, which would permit an assault on the Russian right flank. This seemed reasonable to Wedel, but only if the Russians were not fully deployed.

By 23 July, Wedel had received direct orders from the impatient Frederick to secure a "good position", by which the king meant defensible ground, and to use the preferred means of attack, by which the King meant "oblique order". Wedel knew he must bring the Russians to battle before they could move on Frankfurt or risk his reputation with the King. On 23 July, Wedel ordered another reconnaissance of Saltykov's troops at Langen Meil, a small settlement outside Kay, and found them in motion; assuming they meant to move on Frankfurt, he subsequently ordered an advance on the Russian right flank. Wedel's best opportunity seemed to be securing the Paltzig heights before the Russians could do so, and the best way to do that would be through Kay.

== Battle ==
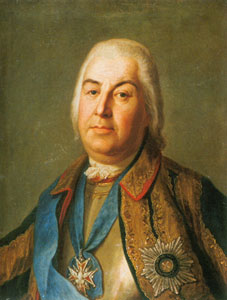
Saltykov masterfully distributed his troops, taking advantage of the heights surrounding the village of Kay (Paltzig).

The Prussian army marched in two columns toward Kay, one on the road directly to Kay, and the other on the road to Mosau. Barely had they emerged from the ravines surrounding the town when they fell into combat with some Russian skirmishers. The Prussians repulsed the initial group, but the arrival of reinforcement meant the onset of generalized action. The Russians subsequently fired on the Prussians from the heights surrounding Kay. General Heinrich von Manteuffel took six battalions and attacked on the artillery; initially they threw him back. A contemporary participant maintained that Manteuffel succeeded in over-running the positions and took 40 pieces of cannon, but there is no official evidence to support his statement. (Note: It is likely that the observer had confused the battle with that of Kunersdorf, in which one of the assaults did take 40 pieces. He goes on to describe marching across a marshy field, terrain which forced the Prussians to break into smaller groups, meaning they were lacking in the critical mass for a successful assault. See Lloyd, pp. 136–137.) There were three assaults at Kay in that afternoon, and each was thrown back.

General Manteuffel had been injured in the attack on the position. Wedel ordered a full cavalry assault through the woods and against the Russian right flank. When the superior Russian force countered, Prussian momentum faltered with the lack of a second column of timely reinforcement. Repeated assaults on the Russians entrenched in the heights resulted in massive losses for the Prussians. In the last of these assaults, Moritz Franz Kasimir von Wobersnow led eight battalions and six squadrons from Züllichau against the Russian right wing. At the same time his cavalry penetrated the enemy's infantry line, but the Russian cavalry, supported by gun-fire, drove them and the infantry back into the low ground.

== Aftermath ==
In the second assault, Manteufel was injured and in the final one, General Wobersnow was killed. Wedel lost up to 8,300 of his troops, although Frederick saw fit to announce losses of only 800, and placed Russian losses at over 7,000. Frederick also blamed the troops, calling them cowardly "scoundrels" despite their repeated and suicidal assaults. He eventually estimated Prussian losses at 1,400, and the Russian losses at 14,000, but he was fooling himself.

The loss at Kay laid open the road to the Oder river and by 28 July Saltykov's troops had reached Crossen. He did not enter Prussia at this point, though, largely due to his problematic relationship with the Austrians. Neither Saltykov or Daun trusted one another; Saltykov neither spoke German nor trusted the translator. Daun did not want to risk losing his entire force. Although Frederick had departed from Saxony in early July, and his brother had marched north at that time too, Daun feared that either of these armies would double back. This not only would prevent him from uniting with Saltykov's army, it could expose his army to Frederick's overpowering force. Instead, Daun sent his auxiliary corps, commanded by Loudon to join with Saltykov. Upon hearing this news, Saltykov considered Daun to be hesitant and dilatory. Eventually, Hadik and Loudon joined at Priebus (Przewóz), 40 km (25 mi) north of Görlitz, on 29 July. In the meantime, Daun had sent additional reinforcements to Loudon, some of the best regiments of the Austrian army; by the time Loudon would reach the Oder, Daun calculated that his force would be at least 20,000, certainly sufficient to shore up Saltykov's already sizable force. On 3 August, the Russians occupied Frankfurt, while the main army camped outside the city on the east bank, and began constructing field fortifications, in preparation for Frederick's eventual arrival. By the following week, Daun's reinforcements joined forces with Saltykov at Kunersdorf.

== References, notes and citations ==
=== Sources ===
- Dowling, Timothy C. Russia at War. ABC-CLIO, 2014, ISBN 978-1-598-84947-9
- Lloyd, Henry. The History of the Late War in Germany, T. and J. Egerton, 1781–90. OCLC 722607771
- Poten, Bernhard von. " Wobersnow, Moritz Franz Kasimir von", Allgemeine Deutsche Biographie, herausgegeben von der Historischen Kommission bei der Bayerischen Akademie der Wissenschaften, Band 43 (1898), p. 700, Digitale Volltext-Ausgabe in Wikisource, Wobersnow (Version of 7 December 2016, 19:31 Uhr UTC)
- Szabo, Franz. The Seven Years War in Europe: 1756–1763. Routledge, 2013, ISBN 978-1-317-88696-9.
- Zabecki, David T. Germany at War: 400 Years of Military History. ABC-CLIO, 2014, ISBN 978-1-59884-981-3
- Arsenyev, Konstantin; Petrushevsky, Fyodor (1903). Brockhaus and Efron Encyclopedic Dictionary (in Russian). Vol. 38. Цензурный Комитет — Человек. Friedrich A. Brockhaus (Leipzig), Ilya A. Efron (St. Petersburg). pp. 338–339.
- Zweguintzow, W. (1967). L'armée russe (Русская армия). Vol. 1. 1700–1763. Paris.
- Clodfelter, Micheal (24 April 2017). Warfare and Armed Conflicts: A Statistical Encyclopedia of Casualty and Other Figures, 1492–2015 (4th ed.). Jefferson, North Carolina: McFarland. ISBN 978-0-7864-7470-7.
