= Battle of Fehrbellin (1758) =

1758 battle

- Part of the Pomeranian War (Seven Years' War)
Date	28 September 1758
Location	near Fehrbellin, Germany
Result	Swedish victory

Belligerents
Sweden	Prussia

Commanders and leaders
(Sweden) Carl Constantin De Carnall	(Kingdom of Prussia) Carl Heinrich von Wedel

Strength
800 men, 3 artillery pieces ~1,500 reinforcements: 2 battalions, 4 squadrons, 4 artillery pieces	5,000–6,000: 6 battalions, 10 squadrons, 20 artillery pieces

Casualties and losses
345 killed, wounded and captured	–

The Battle of Fehrbellin (assault on Fehrbellin) was a military storm of Fehrbellin conducted by the Prussians against the Swedish force. It was fought on 28 September 1758, in the course of the Seven Years' War.

The Prussian forces under General Carl Heinrich von Wedel were attempting to stop the Swedish offensive into Brandenburg. The Swedish forces held the town, with one gun at each of the three gates.

The Prussians arrived first and managed to break through at the western (Mühlenthor) gate, driving the outnumbered Swedes in disarray through the streets. However, reinforcements arrived, and the Prussians, who had failed to burn the bridge, were forced to retreat.

The Swedes lost 23 officers and 322 privates in the battle. Prussian casualties were significant; the Prussians reportedly took with them 15 wagons loaded with dead and wounded soldiers when they retreated.
