= Christopher I, Burgrave and Count of Dohna-Schlodien =

Prussian general and diplomat

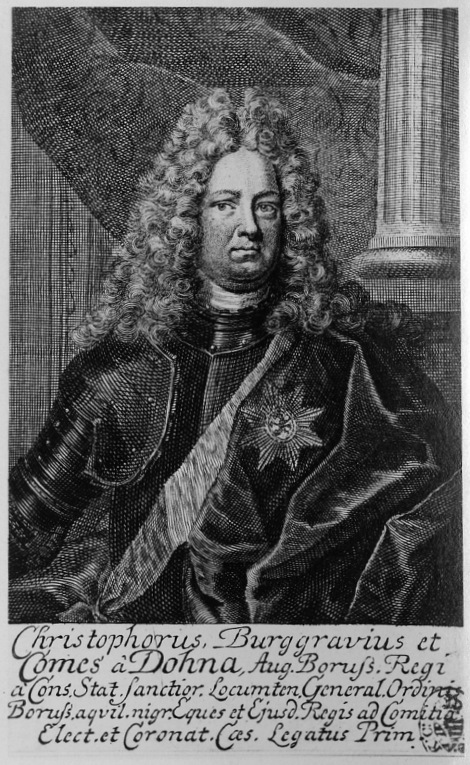
- Christopher I, Burgrave and Count of Dohna-Schlodien
- Born: 2 April 1665; Coppet, Principality of Orange
- Died: 11 October 1733 (aged 68); Schlodien, East Prussia
- Military career
- Allegiance: (Kingdom of Prussia) Prussia
- Service years: 1670-1716
- Conflicts: Nine Years' War
- Awards: Order of the Black Eagle

Christopher I, Burgrave and Count of Dohna-Schlodien (2 April 1665 – 11 October 1733) was a Prussian general and diplomat.

== Life ==
Dohna was born at the Coppet Castle in Coppet near Geneva, one of the sons of Frederick of Dohna (1621–1688), Governor of the Principality of Orange, by his marriage to Espérance du Puy Montbrun. He and his brother Alexander were educated privately by Pierre Bayle.

Dohna joined the Prussian Army in 1670 and was promoted Captain in 1680. He fought in Hungary in 1686 in the Great Turkish War and became a Colonel of the Grands Mousquetaires on 20 October 1686. In 1692 he fought in the Nine Years' War against France, rising to command a regiment of infantry and being promoted Major General in 1698. The same year, he was sent on a diplomatic mission to England. In 1704, he came into conflict with Johann Kasimir Kolbe von Wartenberg and lost much of his influence at the Prussian Royal Court, but returned after Kolbe's dismissal. In 1711 Dohna was the Prussian envoy at the election of Charles VI, Holy Roman Emperor, and was promoted General of Infantry by Frederick I of Prussia in 1713. Dohna became the Amtshauptmann of Prussian Holland and took part in the Siege of Stralsund in 1715. He retired on 10 February 1716 and returned to his estates in East Prussia.

Dohna married a cousin, Frede (Frederica) Marie von Dohna (28 December 1660 - 22 November 1729) on 18 November 1690. Their sons William Alexander (1695–1749) and Christopher II were also Prussian generals. Their daughter Ursula Anna von Dohna-Schlodien-Carwinden (31 December 1700 - 17 March 1761) married Frederick William II, the son of Frederick Louis, Duke of Schleswig-Holstein-Sonderburg-Beck.

Dohna was the first to add Schlodien to his name and died at his family estate of Schlodien.
