= Kije, Lubusz Voivodeship =

Kije
- Village
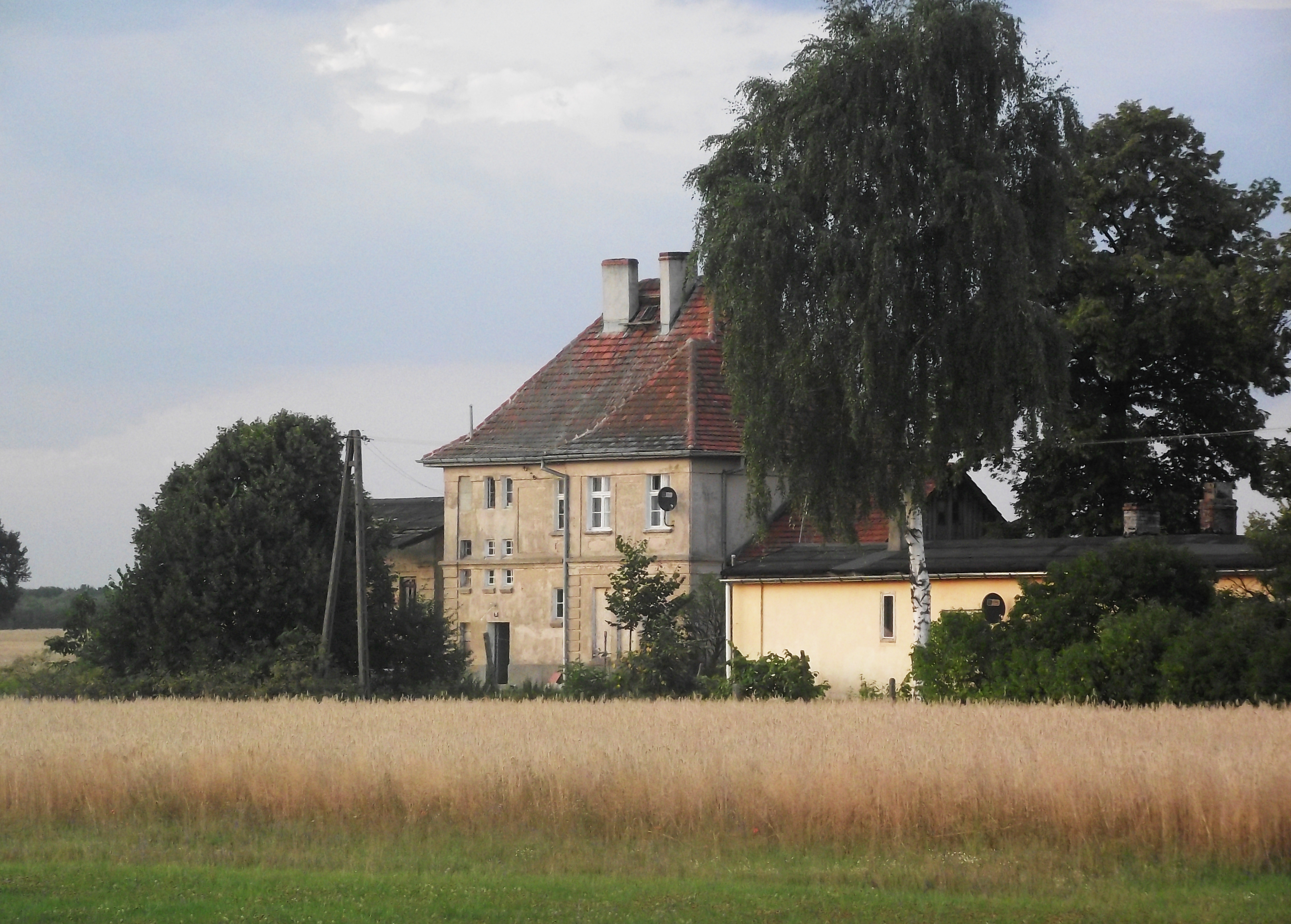
- Former Głogusz train station, Kije

- Location within Poland
- Coordinates: 52°6′N 15°32′E
- Country: Poland
- Voivodeship: Lubusz
- County: Zielona Góra
- Gmina: Sulechów
- Time zone: UTC+1 (CET)
  - Summer (DST): UTC+2 (CEST)
- Vehicle registration: FZI

Kije [ˈkijɛ] is a village in the administrative district of Gmina Sulechów, within Zielona Góra County, Lubusz Voivodeship, in western Poland.

== History ==
The territory formed part of Poland since its establishment in the 10th century. After the fragmentation of Poland into smaller provincial duchies, it formed part of the duchies of Silesia and Głogów. From the 18th century, it formed part of the Kingdom of Prussia. During the Seven Years' War on 23 July 1759 it was the site of the Battle of Kay, where Prussian Army forces under Lieutenant General Carl Heinrich von Wedel fought against the Imperial Russian Army led by Pyotr Saltykov.
