= Battle of Tornow =

1758 battle

Coordinates: 53°3′45″N 13°17′27″E

- Part of the Pomeranian War (Seven Years' War)
Date	29 September 1758
Location	near Tornow, Germany
Result	Swedish victory

Belligerents
(Kingdom of Prussia) Prussia	Sweden

Casualties and losses
153 men	162 men

The Battle of Tornow was fought between the forces of Prussia and Sweden on 26 September 1758 during the Seven Years' War, near modern-day Fürstenberg/Havel (then called Tornow, in the Grand Duchy of Mecklenburg-Strelitz).

Prussian commander Carl Heinrich von Wedel ordered an attack on the Swedish position at Tornow. His cavalry, the 3rd Hussars, were successful in driving off the Swedish horse but the Swedish infantry weathered six assaults by the Prussians and a probe towards Fehrbellin was pushed back. Wedel withdrew from the field, granting the Swedish army a rare victory in the campaign. Casualties were 153 men on the Prussian side and 162 men on the Swedish side. The Swedes evacuated their forward posts in the area in the aftermath of the battle, considering them too exposed to Prussian attack.
