= Christoph II von Dohna =

German military personnel

Christoph II, Burggraf and Count of Dohna-Schlodien
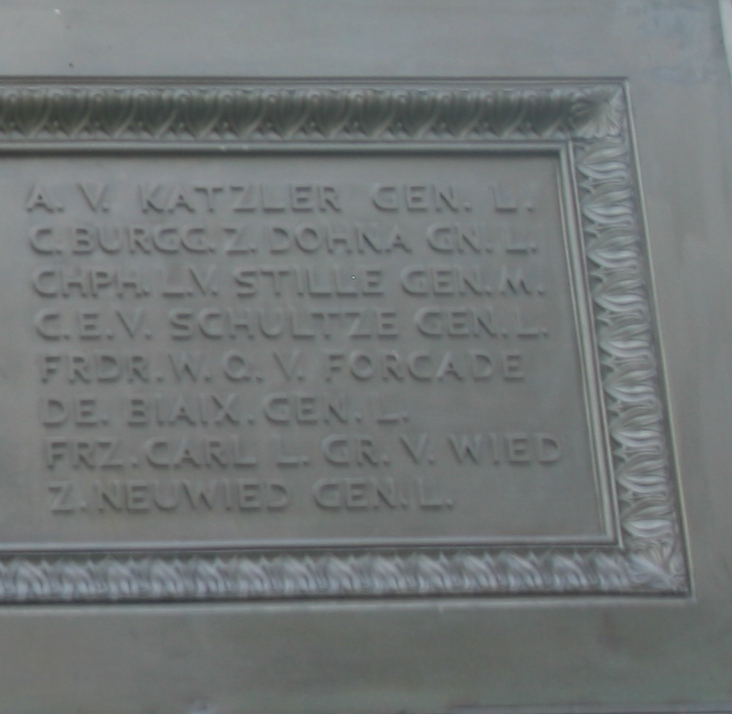
- Christoph II is memorialized on the Equestrian Statue of Frederick the Great in Berlin
- Born: October 25, 1702; Schlodien
- Died: May 19, 1762 (aged 59); Berlin, Prussia
- Known for: General Prussian military in Silesian Wars and Seven Years' War
- Relatives: Christopher I, Burgrave and Count of Dohna-Schlodien

Christoph II, Burggraf and Count of Dohna-Schlodien (25 October 1702 in Schlodien – 19 May 1762 in Berlin) was a Prussian general. He was the son of Christopher I, Burgrave and Count of Dohna-Schlodien (1665–1733). He served in the armies of Frederick William I of Prussia and his son, Frederick II, in the Silesian and Seven Years' wars. He was particularly successful at the Battle of Gross-Jägersdorf, and instrumental in relieving Siege of Kolberg.

== Family ==
Christoph II descended from an old Prussian family, von Dohna, whose founder was Stanislaus von Dohna; his father, Christoph I. zu Dohna-Schlodien, was Stanislaus's great-grandson. His mother, Frede (Friederike) Marie, was the daughter of his uncle, Christian Albert, Burgrave and Count of Dohna. Christoph II married Gräfin Friederike zu Solms-Wildenfels in Wildenfels on 18 October 1734. She was the daughter of Friedrich Christoph zu Solms-Wildenfels . In April 1741 and in December 1742, the couple had daughters Sophia Albertine and Albertina Amalia. In 1747, when the couple had a daughter, the Princess Amalia and two younger brothers stood in for the King at the child's baptism.

Christoph II's military career emulated that of other Junker sons. Many of the Junkers owned immense estates, especially in the north-eastern part of Prussia (i.e. the Prussian provinces of Brandenburg, Pomerania, Silesia, East Prussia and Posen). Their younger sons followed careers as soldiers (Fahnenjunker); consequently, the links between the Junker families to the Prussian Army firmly united the Prussian elite with the Prussian state.

== Military career ==
Promotions

- Fahnrich: 16 August 1718 (Regiment Nr. 23)
- Captain: 1720
- Lt Colonel: 1727
- Colonel (Regiment Nr. 22): 28 July 1740
- Proprietor (Regiment Nr. 4): 1745
- Major General: 1745
- Lt. General: 25 January 1753

Christoph II entered Prussian military in service during the reign of Frederick William I of Prussia and initially served in Infantry Regiment Nr. 23. On 16 August 1718, he was transferred to Infantry Regiment Nr. 3, where he subsequently received command of his own company in 1723. In 1727, the King promoted him directly to Lieutenant-Colonel.

Frederick William died in May 1740 and his son, Frederick II declined to endorse the Pragmatic Sanction. By the end of 1740, with the death of Charles VI, Holy Roman Emperor, Prussia and Austria were at war over Maria Theresa's succession and inheritance. On 20 June 1745, Dohna was appointed major general by patent effective as of 15 May 1743. He became proprietor of Infantry Regiment Nr. 4 in 1745; this regiment, established in 1672, had been his father's and grandfather's during their military service. He later became the proprietor of Infantry Regiment Nr. 23 until 1748; on 14 July 1748, he became proprietor of Infantry Regiment No. 16, which had been established by his grandfather in 1689, and at which he remained until his death in 1762. On 25 January 1751, Frederick promoted him to lieutenant general.

Dohna distinguished himself in the war against Austria, and subsequently in the first two of Frederick's three Silesian Wars. In 1751, he commanded the advanced guard of Hans von Lehwaldt's Corps against the Russians at the first battle of Groß-Jägersdorf, where he was wounded. Dohna was awarded the Order of the Black Eagle in 1753 and also promoted to lieutenant general in January of that year.

After a brief interval of peace, in April 1758 he received the command of Prussia's troops in the Pomeranian Theater, fighting against the Swedes at Stralsund. Sweden's ally, Russia, sent an army to relieve the blockade, which Dohna held at bay with his small force until the Frederick's arrival with the main army at the Oder; Christoph II subsequently commanded a wing—22,000 strong—of the Prussian force at the first meeting at the Zorndorf, an arguably strategic victory for the Prussians but one at which they suffered high losses. Subsequently, he forced the Russians to lift their siege of the Battle of Kolberg, inflicting 600 casualties on the Russians. After relieving the siege, his wing moved against the Austrians under András Hadik in Saxony. By January 1759, he was back in Pomerania fighting the Swedes, and had taken the towns of Damgarten, Richtenberg, Grimm, Greifswald, Demmin and Anklam for Frederick, pushing the Swedes back to Stralsund and Rügen.

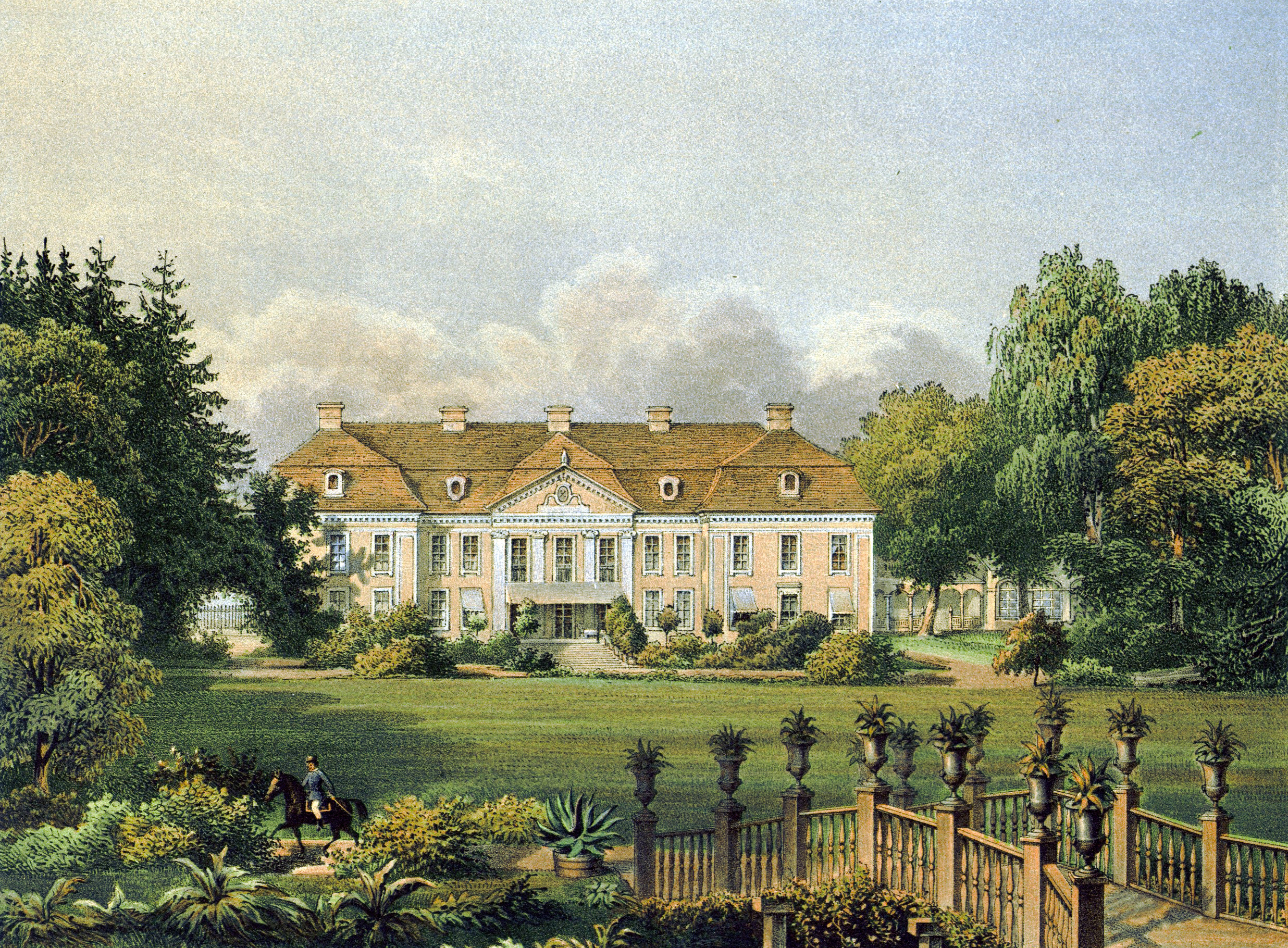
Residence in Gładysze (Schlodien). The service of younger sons in the Prussian Army firmly united the Prussian elite with the Prussian state. The kings rewarded service with estates and honors. Dohna spent little time at his estate; the King wanted him either in Berlin or in the field.

In the years 1758–1759, campaigning in two theaters, Saxony and Upper Pomerania, some 340 kilometres (210 mi) distant from one another, damaged his health. In April 1759, Frederick recalled him to Berlin to recover, writing that Dohna was too sick to continue: "Vous êtes trop malade pour vous charger du commandement. Vous ferez bien de vous faire transporter ou à Berlin ou dans un endroit où vous pourrez remettre votre santé." ("You are too sick to lead your troops; bring yourself to Berlin where you can recover your health.") He was replaced by General Heinrich von Manteuffel. After his recovery, he rejoined the army at Landsberg on the Warthe. On 24 June 1759 he marched with Manteuffel into Poland in their unsuccessful effort to prevent the Russians from advancing into Silesia. On 22 July 1759, he opposed the Russian army at Züllichau, but he again was recalled to Berlin for health reasons before the armies could engage. Carl Heinrich von Wedel, his successor at Züllichau, engaged the Russian army at the Battle of Kay, which the Prussians lost with high casualties.

After his recall, Dohna lived in Berlin until his death on 19 May 1762; his name is engraved on the Frederick II the Great Equestrian Memorial.

Military offices
Preceded by Samuel von Polentz	Proprietor of Infantry Regiment Nr. 4; 1745	Succeeded by Karl Erhard von Kalnein
Preceded by Wolf Alexander Ernst Christoph von Blanckensee	Proprietor of Infantry Regiment Nr. 23; 1745–1748	Succeeded by Friedrich Wilhelm Quirin von Forcade de Biaix
Preceded by Adam Christoph von Flanss	Proprietor of Infantry Regiment Nr. 16; 1748–1762	Succeeded by Friedrich Wilhelm von Syburg
