= Carl Heinrich von Wedel =

Prussian lieutenant general

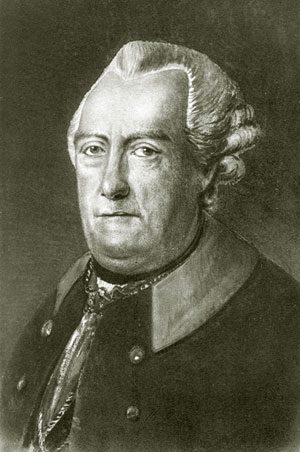
- Born: 12 July 1712; Uckermark, Margraviate of Brandenburg
- Died: 2 April 1782 (aged 69); Göritz
- Military career
- Allegiance: Prussia
- Rank: Lieutenant General
- Conflicts: Seven Years' War; Battle of Leuthen; Battle of Tornow; Battle of Fehrbellin; Battle of Kay; Battle of Kunersdorf
- Awards: Pour le Mérite; Names inscribed on the Equestrian statue of Frederick the Great

Carl Heinrich von Wedel (also spelled Wedell; 12 July 1712 – 2 April 1782) was a Prussian lieutenant general in the War of Austrian Succession (1740–1748), the Seven Years' War (1756–1763), and the War of Bavarian Succession (1778–1779). He fought most notably in the Battle of Tornow in 1758, and the Battle of Kay in 1759. He was instrumental in Frederick the Great's victory at Leuthen in December 1757.

In 1760, Wedel was appointed as Frederick's first Minister of War. He came out of retirement to serve in the War of Bavarian Succession in 1778. Wedel received the Pour le Mérite and his name was inscribed on the Equestrian statue of Frederick the Great in 1851.

== Biography ==
The family Wedel belongs to the Pomeranian nobility. Carl Heinrich Von Wedel was born on 12 July 1712 in the Uckermark, Brandenburg. His father, Georg Wilhelm, was the Uckermark's Superior Court, and owner of the Goritz manor—his mother was Marie Salome of Eichstedt. At fifteen years of age Wedel joined the Prussian military, enlisting as a corporal in the King's Leibregiment (Nr. 6). In 1730 he was promoted to ensign, on 1 March 1735 to second lieutenant. On 23 June 1740, Frederick II appointed him captain and company commander of the Grenadier Guards Battalion (Nr. 6).

== Wars of Austrian Succession ==
Wedel took part in the Silesian Wars, though his regiment did not see battle. Nevertheless, Wedel received on 14 August 1743 a promotion to major in the Infantry Regiment von Kleist (Nr. 26), to which be belonged for the following 14 years. He was wounded in the Battle of Soor in 1745.

Wedel was promoted to lieutenant colonel on 8 September 1751, and awarded the Pour le Mérite on 31 May 1752. He was promoted on 17 June 1755 to the rank of colonel.

== Seven Years' War ==
The first battle experience Wedel's regiment had in the Seven Years' War occurred at the Battle of Prague on 6 May 1757. Six days later, he was appointed regimental commander. He was present at the Battle of Rossbach. At Leuthen, he led his regiment on the difficult march to flank the Austrian left; by 1 p.m. his regiment was in place, and launched its attack. This regiment fulfilled their role with such success that 14 members were awarded the Pour le Mérite.

On 5 January 1758 Wedel took over the Infantry Regiment Schultze (Nr. 29), though he moved to the head office of his prior regiment only three weeks later. In the spring he joined the siege corps before Olomouc. Wedel repulsed Laudon's attacks in Littau on 20 June, and in Gundersdorf on 28 June. In September, he was transferred to a corps in the Uckermark to free it from Swedish control.

Frederick II promoted Wedel to lieutenant general on 22 February 1759. In July, he was transferred command of the Dohna Corps, Frederick deciding the Christoph von Dohna was too ill to continue. Frederick sent Wedel to thwart the Russian advance into Brandenburg with 28,000 men; these were not enough. Due to Wedel's poor management and aggressiveness—he was ordered to attack a Russian army one-and-a-half times his size—they were crushed at the Battle of Kay. This loss left the road to Berlin open, and Frederick was forced to hurry north to Frankfurt an der Oder to repel the Russian and Austrian allied armies. At the subsequent Kunersdorf, Wedel was severely wounded. Health problems forced him to retire from active service in 1760.

=== Last years ===
Wedel subsequently served as Frederick's minister of war. Wedel was recalled to service for Frederick's last war with Austria over the Bavarian succession. He died 2 April 1782 in Göritz.

Frederick's heirs considered Wedel one of the key generals in the establishment of the Prussian state and included his name on the Equestrian statue of Frederick the Great in 1851.

== Family ==
In 1747, Wedel married Friederike Auguste von Bröcker. Their marriage produced four daughters and a son. Two daughters survived to adulthood and married the sons of Wilhelm Gustav von Anhalt-Dessau.

- Caroline Friederike (19 February 1748 – 5 June 1780) ∞ 10 February 1768 to Heinrich Wilhelm von Anhalt (1735–1801)
- Friederike Albertine (17 September 1751 – 8 October 1825) ∞ Karl Philipp von Anhalt (1732–1806)
