= Austro-Prussian rivalry =

Cooperation and rivalry between Austria and Prussia up to 1866

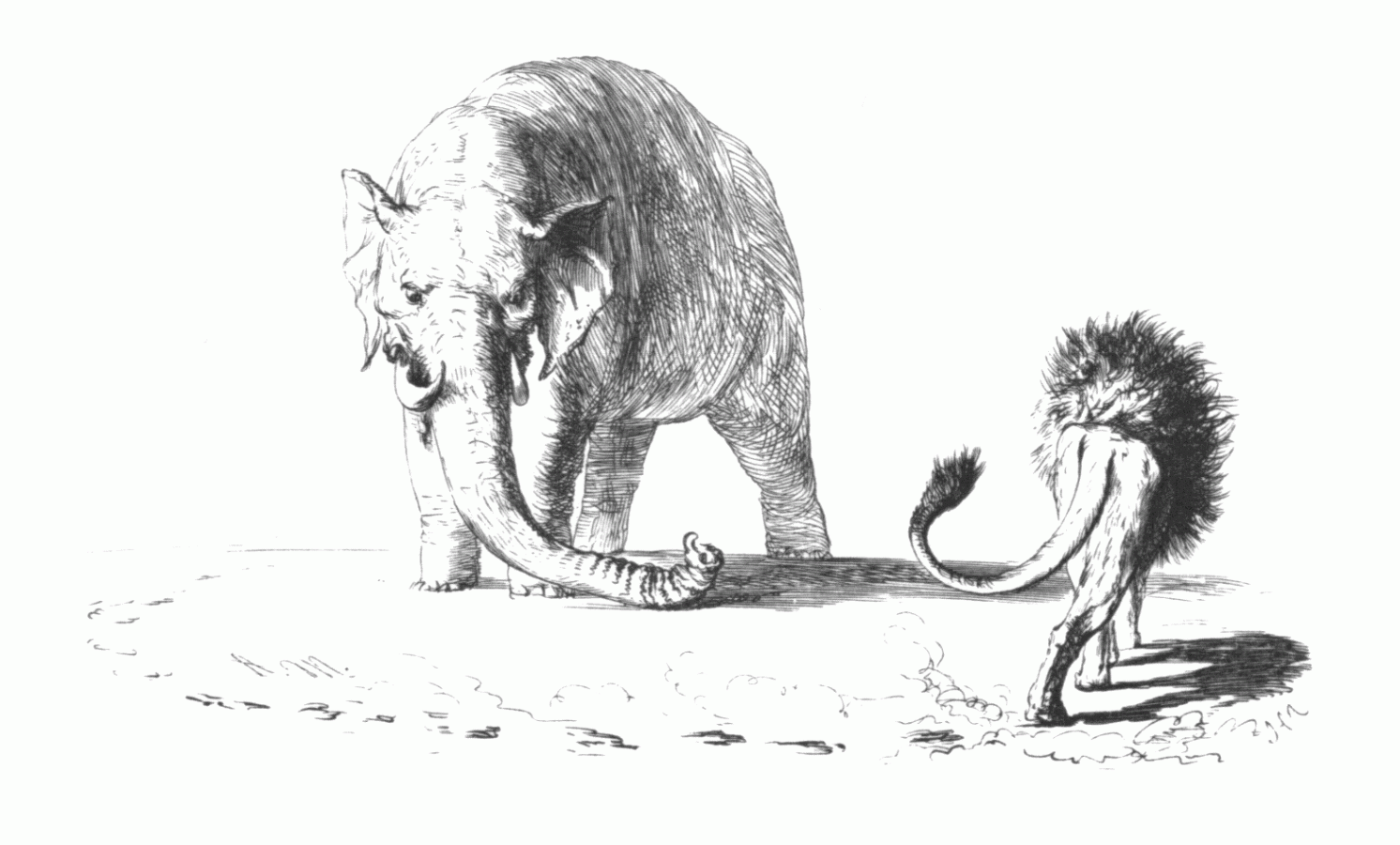
The Prussian lion circling around the Austrian elephant. Illustration by Adolph Menzel, 1846.

Austria and Prussia were the most powerful German states in the Holy Roman Empire by the 18th and 19th centuries and had engaged in a struggle for supremacy among smaller German states. The rivalry was characterized by major territorial conflicts and economic, cultural, and political aspects. Therefore, the rivalry was an important element of the German question in the 19th century.

The opponents first met in the Silesian Wars and Seven Years' War during the middle 18th century until the conflict's culmination in the Austro-Prussian War of 1866.

A closely related German term, Deutscher Dualismus (literally German dualism), refers not only to this rivalry but also to cooperation between Austria and Prussia, for example in the Napoleonic Wars. Indeed, the two powers did jointly dominate the German Confederation, which functioned only in times of cooperation (1815–1848 and 1851–1859). They also fought on the same side (against Denmark) in the Second Schleswig War (1864).

After 1866 (North German Confederation) and 1871, the new German nation state was dominated by Prussia. As Austria (or Austria-Hungary, since 1867) no longer struggled over the hegemony in Germany, the term Deutscher Dualismus became meaningless. Germany and Austria-Hungary soon became close allies, as proven by the Zweibund of 1879. The two countries were the main Central Powers during World War I (1914–1918). After that war, Austria-Hungary fell apart, and Germany became a republic.

== Background ==
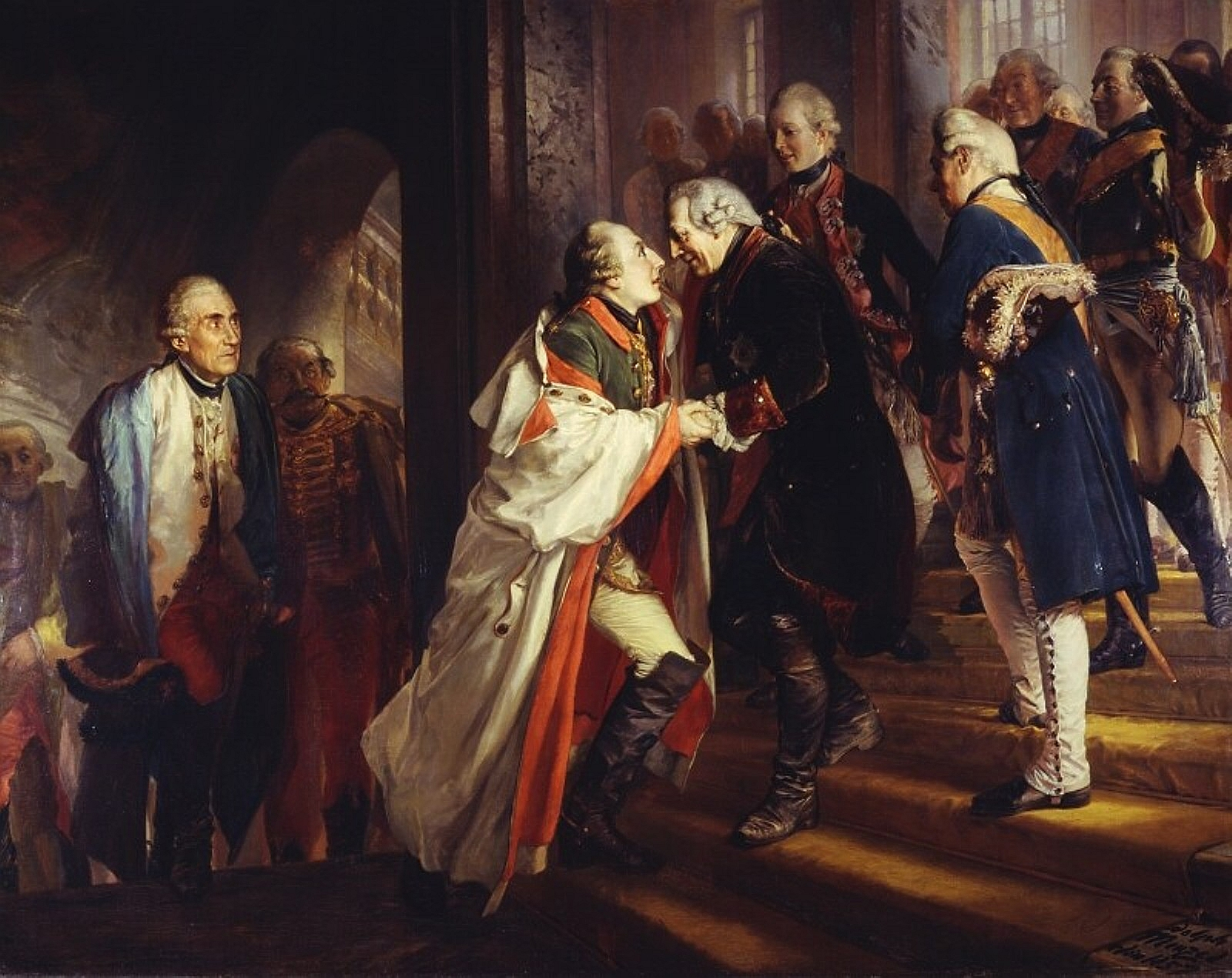
Frederick II of Prussia and Joseph II, Holy Roman Emperor meet at Neisse on 25 August 1769

The Margraviate of Brandenburg was officially declared one of the seven electorates of the Holy Roman Empire by the Golden Bull of 1356. It had extended most of its territory into the eastern Neumark region, and, after the War of the Jülich succession, by the 1614 Treaty of Xanten, it also gained the Duchy of Cleves and the counties of Mark and Ravensberg located in northwestern Germany. It finally grew out of the Imperial borders when in 1618 the Hohenzollern electors became dukes of Prussia, then a fief of the Polish Crown, and the lands of Brandenburg-Prussia were ruled in personal union. In 1653, the "Great Elector" Frederick William acquired Farther Pomerania and reached full sovereignty in Ducal Prussia by the 1657 Treaty of Wehlau concluded with the Polish king John II Casimir Vasa. In 1701, Frederick William's son and successor Frederick I obtained the consent of Emperor Leopold I to proclaim himself a King "in" Prussia at Königsberg, with respect to the fact that he still held the electoral dignity of Brandenburg and the royal title was only valid in the Prussian lands outside the Empire.

The centuries-long rise of the Austrian House of Habsburg had already begun with King Rudolph's victory at the 1278 Battle on the Marchfeld and the final obtainment of the Imperial crown by Emperor Frederick III in 1452. His descendants Maximilian I and Philip the Fair by marriage gained the inheritance of the Burgundian dukes and the Spanish Crown of Castile (tu felix Austria nube), and, under Emperor Charles V, the Habsburg realm evolved to a European great power. In 1526 his brother Ferdinand I inherited the Lands of the Bohemian Crown as well as the Kingdom of Hungary outside the borders of the Empire, laying the foundation of the Central European Habsburg monarchy. From the 15th to the 18th century, all Holy Roman Emperors were Austrian archdukes of the Habsburg dynasty, who also held the Bohemian and Hungarian royal dignity.

After the Protestant Reformation, the Catholic Habsburgs had to accept the 1555 Peace of Augsburg and failed to strengthen their Imperial authority in the disastrous Thirty Years' War. Upon the 1648 Peace of Westphalia, Austria had to deal with the rising Brandenburg-Prussian power in the north, which replaced the Electorate of Saxony as the leading Protestant estate. The efforts made by the "Great Elector" and the "Soldier-king" Frederick William I had created a progressive state with a highly effective Prussian Army that, sooner or later, had to collide with the Habsburg claims to power.

== History ==
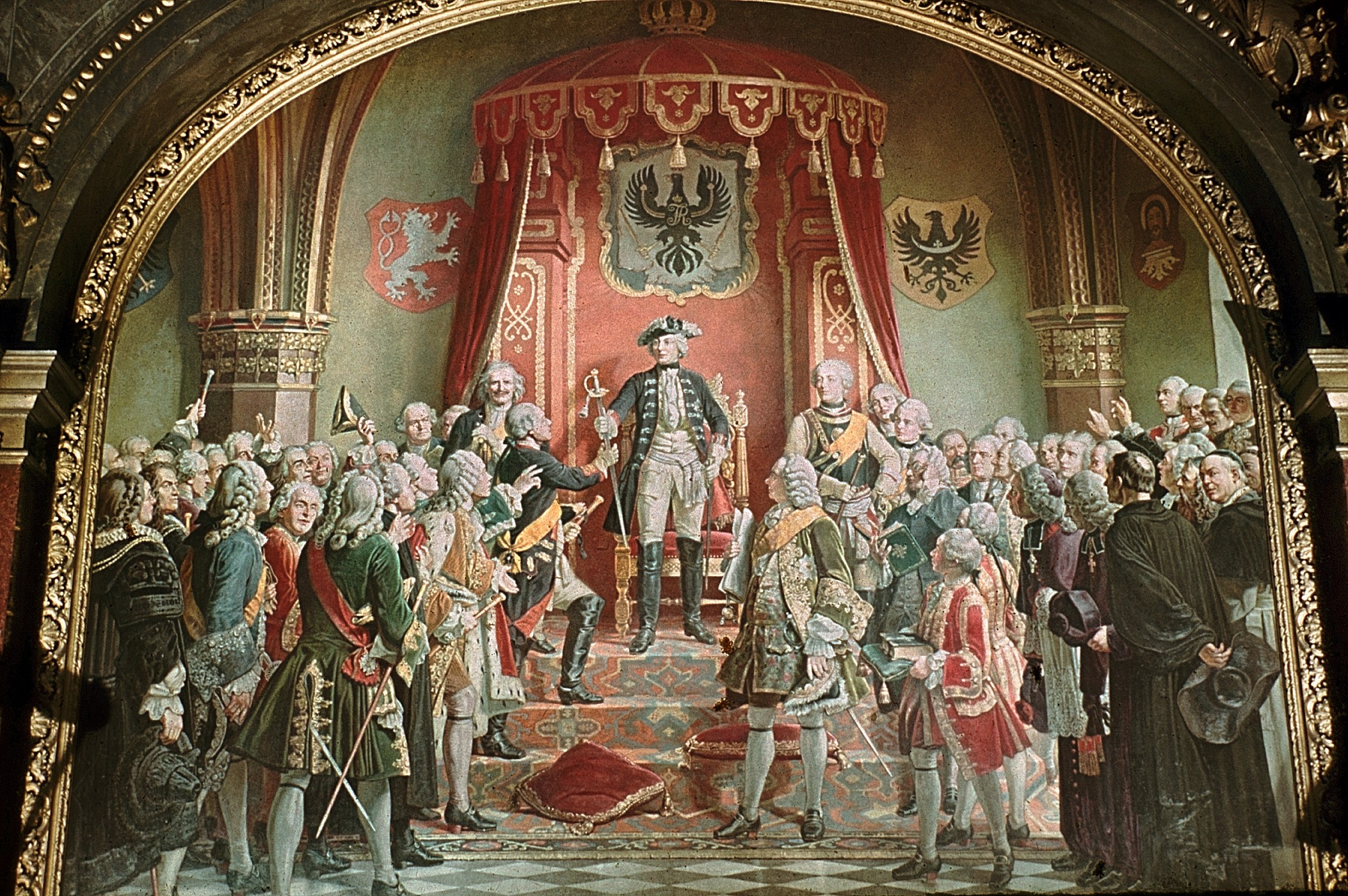
Frederick receives homage from the Silesian estates, wall painting by Wilhelm Camphausen, 1882

The rivalry is largely held to have begun upon the death of the Habsburg Emperor Charles VI in 1740; King Frederick the Great of Prussia launched an invasion of Austrian-controlled Silesia, starting the First Silesian War (of three Silesian Wars to come) against Maria Theresa. Frederick had broken his promise to acknowledge the Pragmatic Sanction of 1713 and the indivisibility of the Habsburg territories, whereby he sparked the pan–European War of the Austrian Succession. He decisively defeated the Austrian troops at the 1742 Battle of Chotusitz, whereafter Maria Theresa, by the Treaties of Breslau and Berlin, had to cede the bulk of the Silesian lands to Prussia.

At the time, Austria still claimed the mantle of the Empire and was the chief force of the disunited German states. Until 1745, Maria Theresa was able to regain the Imperial crown from her Wittelsbach rival Charles VII by occupying his Bavarian lands, but, despite her Quadruple Alliance with Great Britain, the Dutch Republic and Saxony, she failed to recapture Silesia: The Second Silesian War started with Frederick's invasion of Bohemia in 1744. After the Prussian victory at the 1745 Battle of Kesselsdorf, by the Treaty of Dresden the status quo ante bellum it was confirmed that Frederick would keep Silesia but finally acknowledge the accession of Maria Theresa's husband, Emperor Francis I. The terms were again confirmed by the final Peace of Aix-la-Chapelle in 1748.

Maria Theresa, still chafing under the loss of the most beautiful gem of my crown, took the opportunity of the breathing space to implement several civil and military reforms within the Austrian lands, like the establishment of the Theresian Military Academy at Wiener Neustadt in 1751. Her capable state chancellor, Prince Wenzel Anton of Kaunitz, succeeded in the Diplomatic Revolution of 1756, allying with the former Habsburg nemesis France under King Louis XV in order to isolate Prussia. Frederick, however, had completed the "stately quadrille" by the conclusion of the Treaty of Westminster with Great Britain. He again took action by a preemptive war, invading Saxony and opening a Third Silesian War (and the wider Seven Years' War).

Nevertheless, the conquest of Prague failed and, moreover, the king had to deal with Russian forces attacking East Prussia while Austrian troops entered Silesia. His situation worsened when Austrian and Russian forces united to inflict a crushing defeat on him at the 1759 Battle of Kunersdorf. Frederick, on the brink, was saved by the discord among the victors in the "Miracle of the House of Brandenburg", when Empress Elizabeth of Russia died on 5 January 1762 and her successor Peter III concluded peace with Prussia. By the 1763 Treaty of Hubertusburg, Austria, for the third time, had to acknowledge the Prussian annexations. The usurper kingdom had prevailed against the European great powers and would play a vital future role in the "Concert of Europe".

Austria and Prussia both would fight France in the Napoleonic Wars; after their conclusion, the German states were reorganized into a more unified 37 separate states of the German Confederation. German nationalists began to demand a unified Germany, especially in 1848 and its revolutions. They were conflicted over the best nation-state to accomplish this, a question that became known as the German question. The "Lesser Germany" (Kleindeutschland) solution favored Protestant Prussia annexing all the German states except Austria, while "Greater Germany" (Grossdeutschland) favored Catholic Austria taking control of the separate German states. The Schleswig–Holstein question also became tied up in the debate; the Second Schleswig War saw Denmark lose to the combined forces of Austria and Prussia, but Prussia would later gain full control of the province after the Austro-Prussian War, which thus saw Austria being excluded from Germany. After the Franco-Prussian War, Germany was unified under Prussia to become the German Empire in 1871, and the rivalry is often seen as subsiding after the Congress of Berlin in 1878. Germany, led by Prussia, had become the superior power to Austria-Hungary.

== See also ==
- German question
- War of the Austrian Succession
- War of the Bavarian Succession
- Anschluss
- Fürstenbund
- German Confederation
- Erfurt Union
- Punctation of Olmütz
- Austro-Prussian War
- Unification of Germany
