= First Silesian War =

18th-century war between Prussia and Austria

- Part of the War of the Austrian Succession and the Silesian Wars
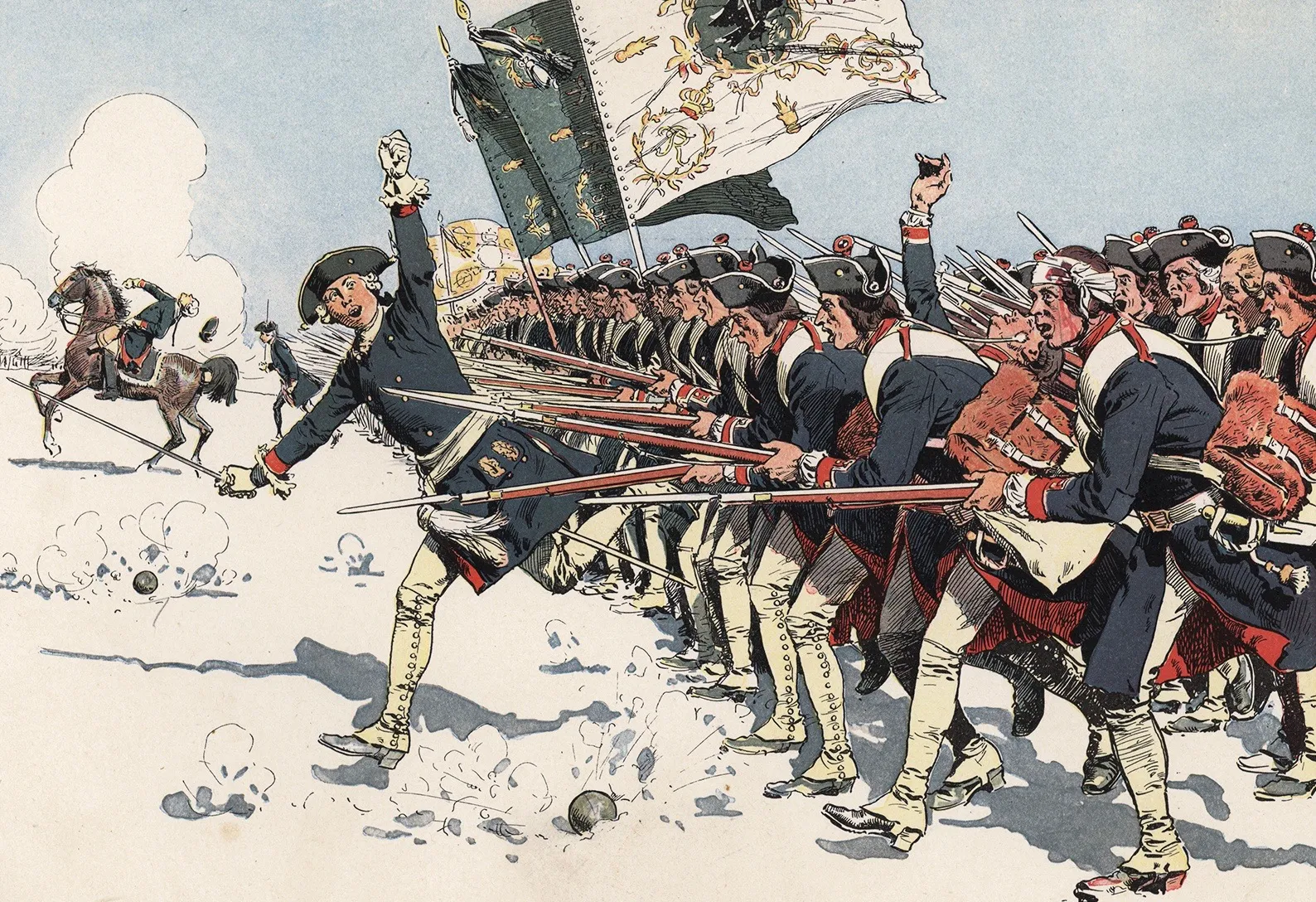
- Prussian infantry advancing at the Battle of Mollwitz
Date	16 December 1740 – 11 June 1742
Location	Silesia, Moravia, Bohemia
Result	Prussian victory
Territorial changes	Habsburg Monarchy cedes the majority of Silesia to Prussia.

Belligerents
Prussia	Habsburg monarchy

Commanders and leaders
(Kingdom of Prussia) King Frederick II: Prince Leopold II of Anhalt-Dessau; Count Kurt von Schwerin	(Habsburg monarchy) Archduchess Maria Theresa: Prince Charles of Lorraine; Count Wilhelm Reinhard von Neipperg

The First Silesian War (German: Erster Schlesischer Krieg) was a war between Prussia and Austria that lasted from 1740 to 1742 and resulted in Prussia's seizure of most of the region of Silesia (now in south-western Poland) from Austria. The war was fought mainly in Silesia, Moravia and Bohemia (the lands of the Bohemian Crown) and formed one theatre of the wider War of the Austrian Succession. It was the first of three Silesian Wars fought between Frederick the Great's Prussia and Maria Theresa's Austria in the mid-18th century, all three of which ended in Prussian control of Silesia.

No particular triggering event started the war. Prussia cited its centuries-old dynastic claims on parts of Silesia as a casus belli, but Realpolitik and geostrategic factors also played a role in provoking the conflict. Maria Theresa's contested succession to the Habsburg monarchy provided an opportunity for Prussia to strengthen itself relative to regional rivals such as Saxony and Bavaria.

The war began with a Prussian invasion of Habsburg Silesia in late 1740, and it ended in a Prussian victory with the 1742 Treaty of Berlin, which recognised Prussia's seizure of most of Silesia and parts of Bohemia. Meanwhile, the wider War of the Austrian Succession continued, and conflict over Silesia would draw Austria and Prussia into a renewed Second Silesian War only two years later. The First Silesian War marked the unexpected defeat of the Habsburg monarchy by a lesser German power and initiated the Austria–Prussia rivalry that would shape German politics for more than a century.

== Context and causes ==
In the early 18th century, Prussia's ruling House of Hohenzollern held dynastic claims to various duchies within the Habsburg province of Silesia, a populous and prosperous region contiguous with Prussia's core territory in the Margraviate of Brandenburg. Besides its value as a source of tax revenue, industrial output (particularly minerals) and military recruits, Silesia held great geostrategic importance to the belligerents. The valley of the Upper Oder formed a natural military conduit between Brandenburg, the Kingdom of Bohemia and the Margraviate of Moravia, and whichever power held the territory could threaten its neighbours. Silesia also lay along the north-eastern frontier of the Holy Roman Empire, allowing its controller to limit the influence of the Polish–Lithuanian Commonwealth and of the Russian Empire within Germany.

=== Brandenburg–Prussia's claims ===
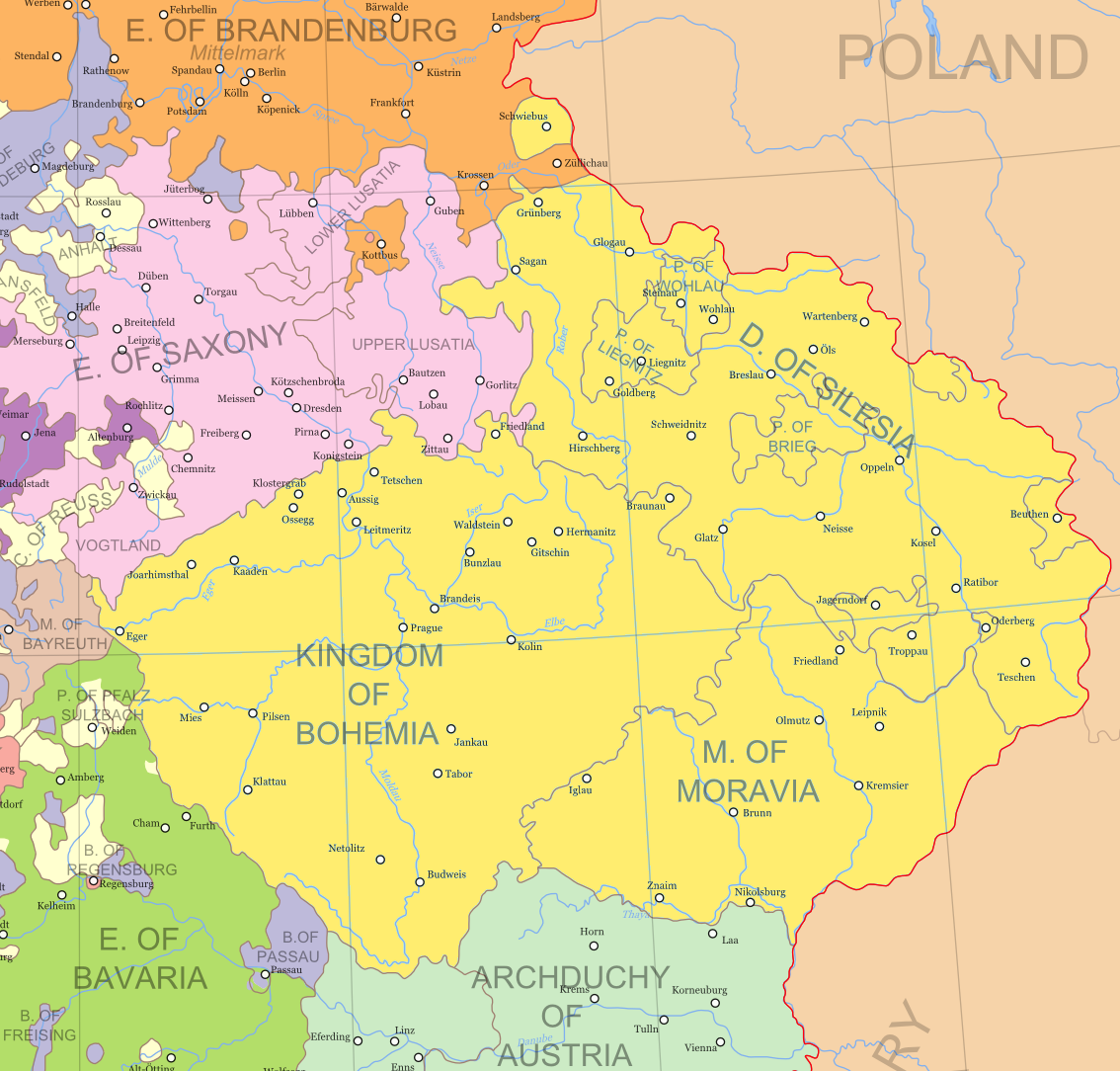
The Lands of the Bohemian Crown under Habsburg rule until 1742, when most of Silesia was ceded to Prussia

Prussia's claims in Silesia were based, in part, on a 1537 inheritance treaty between the Silesian Piast Duke Frederick II of Legnica and the Hohenzollern Prince-Elector Joachim II Hector of Brandenburg, whereby the Silesian Duchies of Liegnitz, Wohlau and Brieg were to pass to the Hohenzollerns of Brandenburg should the Piast dynasty in Silesia become extinct. At the time, the Habsburg King Ferdinand I of Bohemia (Silesia's feudal overlord) rejected the agreement and pressed the Hohenzollerns to repudiate it. In 1603, Hohenzollern Elector Joachim III Frederick of Brandenburg separately inherited the Silesian Duchy of Jägerndorf from his cousin, Margrave George Frederick of Brandenburg-Ansbach, and installed his second son, Johann Georg, as duke.

In the 1618 Bohemian Revolt and the ensuing Thirty Years' War, Johann Georg joined the Silesian estates in revolt against the Catholic Holy Roman Emperor Ferdinand II. After the Catholic victory in the 1621 Battle of White Mountain, the Emperor confiscated Johann Georg's duchy and refused to return it to his heirs after his death, but the Hohenzollerns of Brandenburg continued to assert themselves as the legitimate rulers of Jägerndorf. In 1675 the "Great Elector" Frederick William of Brandenburg laid claim to Liegnitz, Wohlau and Brieg when the Silesian Piast line ended with the death of Duke George William of Liegnitz, but the Habsburg Emperor disregarded the Hohenzollern claims and the lands escheated to the Bohemian crown.

In 1685, when Austria was engaged in the Great Turkish War, Emperor Leopold I gave Great Elector Frederick William immediate control of the Silesian exclave of Schwiebus in return for military support against the Turks and the surrender of the outstanding Hohenzollern claims in Silesia. After the accession of the Great Elector's son and successor, Frederick III of Brandenburg, the Emperor took back control of Schwiebus in 1694, claiming the territory had only been personally assigned to the late Great Elector for life. As a young prince, Frederick III had secretly agreed to this repossession in return for Leopold's payment of some of his debts, but as monarch he repudiated the agreement and reasserted the old Hohenzollern claims to Jägerndorf and the Silesian Piast heritage.

=== Austrian succession ===
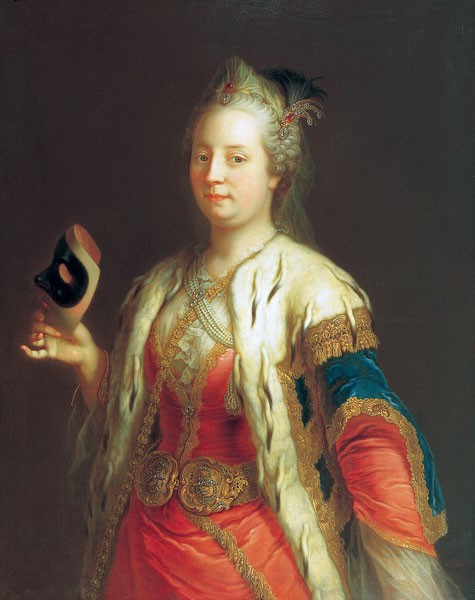
Maria Theresa of Austria c. 1744, by Martin van Meytens

Two generations later, the newly crowned Hohenzollern King Frederick II of Prussia formed designs on Silesia soon after succeeding to the throne in May 1740. Frederick judged that his dynasty's claims were credible, and he had inherited from his father, King Frederick William I, a large and well-trained Prussian army and a healthy royal treasury. Austria was in financial distress, and its army had not been reinforced or reformed after an ignominious performance in the 1737–1739 Austro-Turkish War. The European strategic situation was favourable for an attack on Austria, with Britain and France occupying each other's attentions in the War of Jenkins' Ear and Sweden moving toward war with Russia; the Electors of Bavaria and Saxony also had claims against Austria and seemed likely to join in the attack. Though the Hohenzollerns' dynastic claims provided a legalistic casus belli, considerations of Realpolitik and geostrategy played the leading role in provoking the war.

An opportunity arose for Prussia to press its claims when Habsburg Holy Roman Emperor Charles VI died in October 1740 without a male heir. With the Pragmatic Sanction of 1713, Charles had established his eldest daughter, Maria Theresa, as the successor to his hereditary titles. Upon his death she duly became ruler of Austria, as well as of the Bohemian and Hungarian lands within the Habsburg monarchy. During Emperor Charles's lifetime the Pragmatic Sanction had been generally acknowledged by the imperial states, but when he died it was promptly contested by Prussia, Bavaria and Saxony.

Frederick saw in Austria's female succession an opportune moment for the seizure of Silesia, calling it "the signal for the complete transformation of the old political system" in a 1740 letter to Voltaire. He argued that the Pragmatic Sanction did not apply to Silesia, which was held by the Habsburgs as a part of the imperial demesne rather than as a hereditary possession. Frederick also argued that his father had assented to the Sanction in return for assurances of Austrian support for Hohenzollern claims on the Rhenish Duchies of Jülich and Berg, which had not yet materialised.

Meanwhile, Prince-Elector Charles Albert of Bavaria and Prince-Elector Frederick Augustus II of Saxony had each married one of Maria Theresa's older cousins from a senior branch of the House of Habsburg, and they used these connections to justify claims to Habsburg territory in the absence of a male heir. Frederick Augustus, who ruled Poland-Lithuania in personal union, was especially interested in gaining control of Silesia to connect his two realms into one contiguous territory (which would nearly surround Brandenburg); Frederick's concern to prevent this outcome contributed to his haste in moving against Austria when the contested succession provided an opportunity.

=== Moves toward war ===
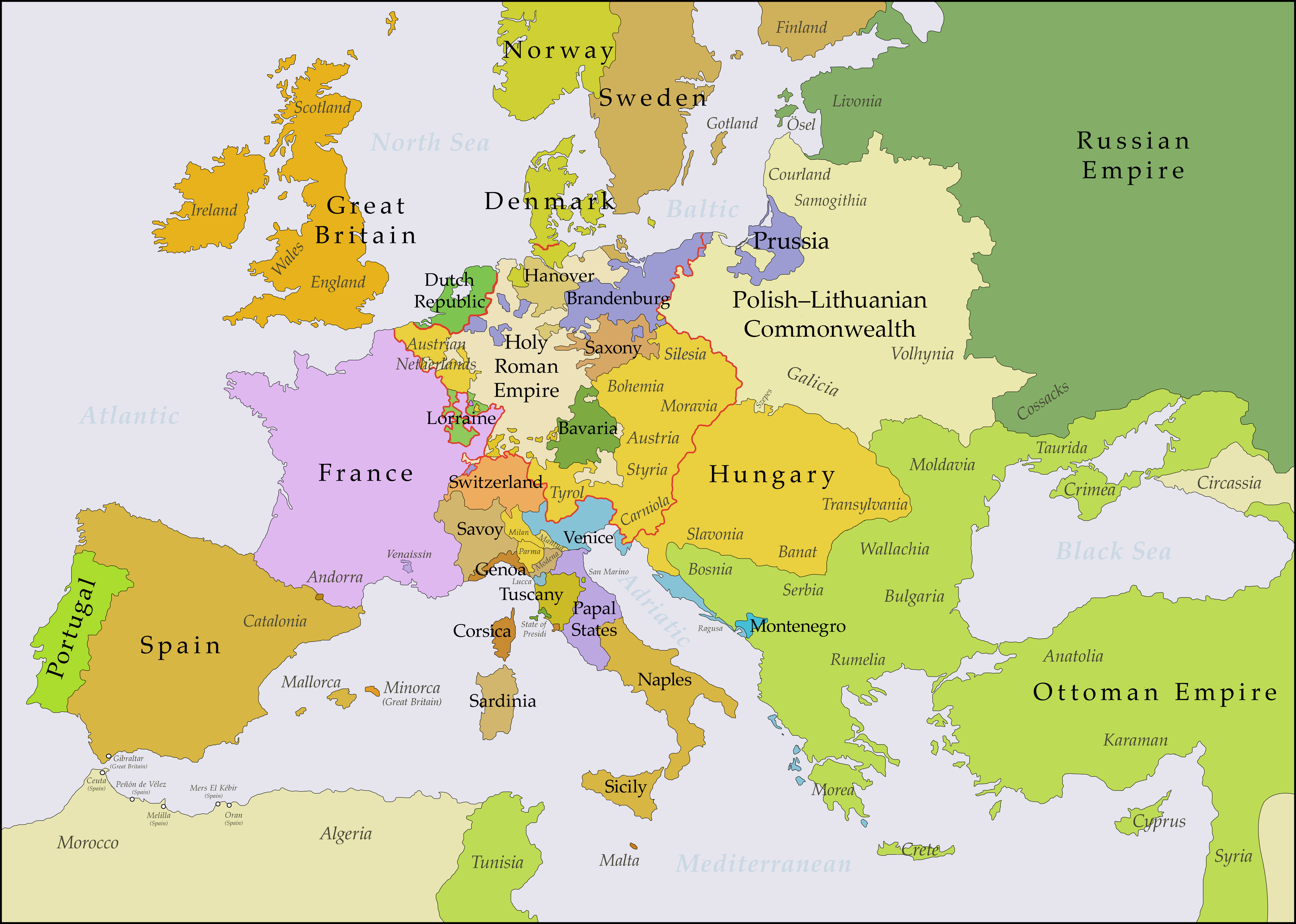
Europe in the years after the Treaty of Vienna (1738), with Prussia in violet and the Habsburg monarchy in gold

As Prussia reactivated its Silesian claims and prepared for war against Austria, several other European powers made similar moves. Charles Albert of Bavaria launched a claim to the imperial throne along with the Habsburg territories of Bohemia, Upper Austria and Tyrol, while Frederick Augustus of Saxony laid claim to Moravia and Upper Silesia. The Kingdoms of Spain and Naples hoped to seize Habsburg possessions in northern Italy, while France, which viewed the Habsburgs as traditional rivals, sought control of the Austrian Netherlands. The Electorates of Cologne and the Palatinate joined these to form an alliance known as the League of Nymphenburg, which aimed at the diminution or destruction of the Habsburg monarchy and its dominant position among the German states.

Austria was supported by Great Britain (in personal union with the Electorate of Hanover) and, eventually, Savoy–Sardinia and the Dutch Republic; the Russian Empire under Empress Elizabeth also indirectly took Austria's side in the wider conflict by making war against Sweden (a French ally at the time). Maria Theresa's aims in the conflict were, first, to preserve her hereditary lands and titles and, second, to win or compel support for the election of her husband, Duke Francis Stephen of Lorraine, as Holy Roman Emperor, defending her house's traditional pre-eminence within Germany.

After Emperor Charles's death on 20 October, Frederick quickly resolved to strike first; on 8 November he ordered the mobilisation of the Prussian army, and on 11 December he issued an ultimatum to Maria Theresa demanding the cession of Silesia. In return, he offered to guarantee all other Habsburg possessions against any attack, pay a large cash indemnity, acknowledge the Pragmatic Sanction, and give his vote as elector of Brandenburg in the imperial election to Maria Theresa's husband. Not waiting for a response, he and his troops advanced into Silesia.

=== Methods and technologies ===
European warfare in the early modern period was characterised by the widespread adoption of firearms in combination with more traditional bladed weapons. Eighteenth-century European armies were built around units of massed infantry armed with smoothbore flintlock muskets and bayonets. Cavalrymen were equipped with sabres and pistols or carbines; light cavalry were used principally for reconnaissance, screening and tactical communications, while heavy cavalry were used as tactical reserves and deployed for shock attacks. Smoothbore artillery provided fire support and played the leading role in siege warfare. Strategic warfare in this period centred around control of key fortifications positioned so as to command the surrounding regions and roads, with lengthy sieges a common feature of armed conflict. Decisive field battles were relatively rare, though they played a larger part in Frederick's theory of warfare than was typical among his contemporary rivals.

The Silesian Wars, like most European wars of the 18th century, were fought as so-called cabinet wars in which disciplined regular armies were equipped and supplied by the state to conduct warfare on behalf of the sovereign's interests. Occupied enemy territories were regularly taxed and extorted for funds, but large-scale atrocities against civilian populations were rare compared with conflicts in the previous century. Military logistics was the decisive factor in many wars, as armies had grown too large to support themselves on prolonged campaigns by foraging and plunder alone. Military supplies were stored in centralised magazines and distributed by baggage trains that were highly vulnerable to enemy raids. Armies were generally unable to sustain combat operations during winter and normally established winter quarters in the cold season, resuming their campaigns with the return of spring.

== Course ==
=== Silesian campaign of 1740–41 ===
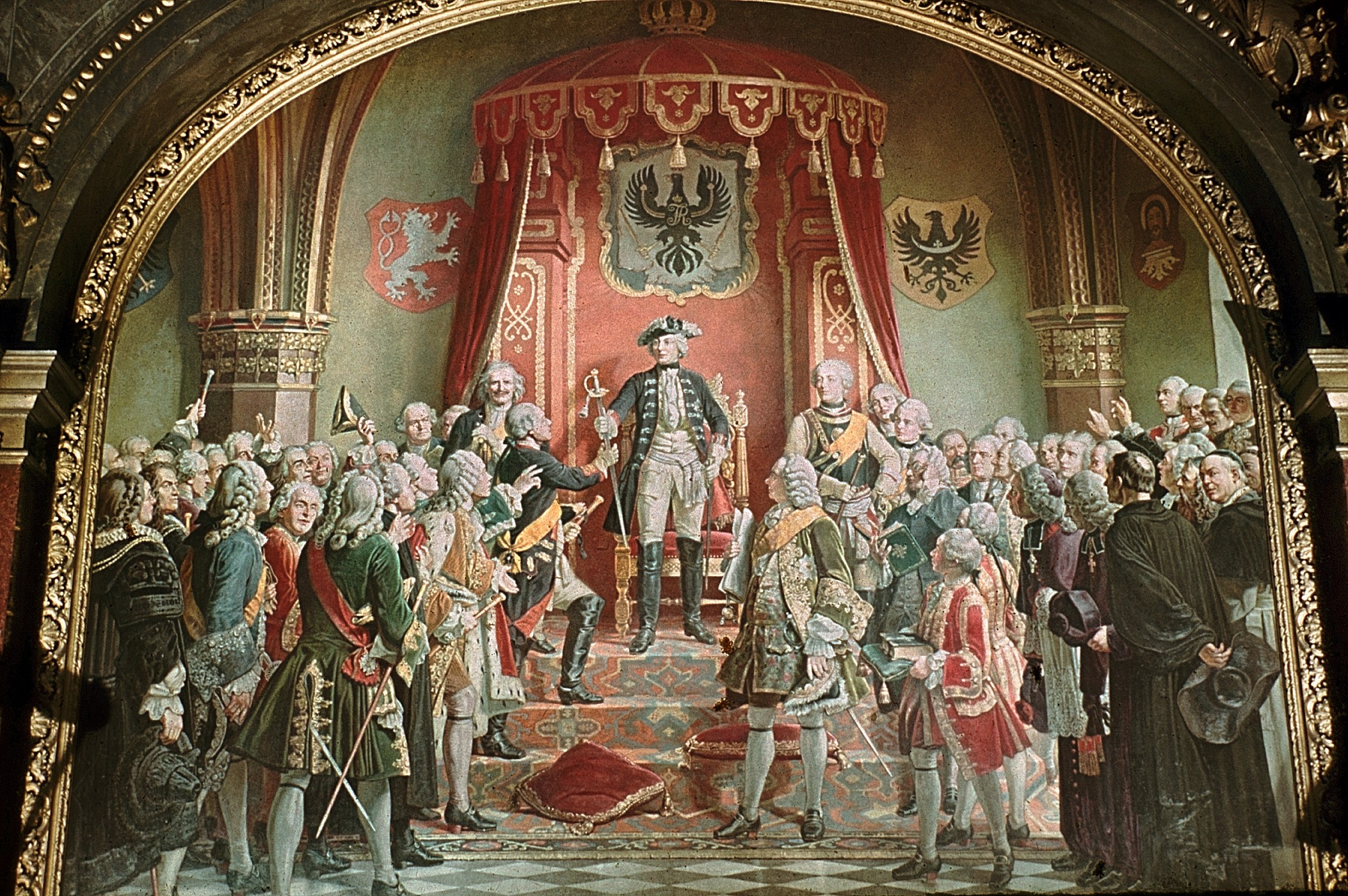
Frederick the Great receiving the homage of the Silesian estates in 1741, depicted in an 1882 painting by Wilhelm Camphausen

The Prussian army had massed quietly along the Oder during early December 1740, and on 16 December, without a declaration of war, Frederick moved his troops across the frontier into Silesia. The Prussian force consisted of two corps totalling 27,000 soldiers, while Silesia was defended by an Austrian garrison of only 8,000 men. The Austrians were able to offer only light resistance and garrison a few fortresses; the Prussians swept through the province, taking control of the capital at Breslau without a fight on 2 January 1741. The fortress at Ohlau was also taken without resistance on 9 January, after which the Prussians used it for their winter quarters. By the end of January 1741, almost the entirety of Silesia had come under Prussian control, and the remaining Austrian strongholds of Glogau, Brieg and Neisse were besieged.

After leaving winter quarters in early 1741, the Prussian forces began a spring campaign, and on 9 March Prince Leopold II of Anhalt-Dessau took Glogau by storm. In late March, an Austrian force of around 20,000 under the command of Wilhelm Reinhard von Neipperg crossed the Sudetes mountains from Moravia and broke the siege of Neisse on 5 April, after which the main Prussian force manoeuvred to oppose its advance. The two armies engaged each other near the village of Mollwitz on 10 April, where the Prussians under Marshal Kurt von Schwerin successfully stopped the Austrian advance in the Battle of Mollwitz. Neither army acquitted itself well at Mollwitz, and Frederick at one point fled (on Schwerin's advice) to avoid capture, but the Prussians held the field and subsequently portrayed the battle as a victory. Brieg surrendered to the Prussians on 4 May, after which the main Prussian force encamped through the succeeding months near Neisse, facing off against Neipperg's Austrians but fighting little.

=== Negotiations of mid-1741 ===
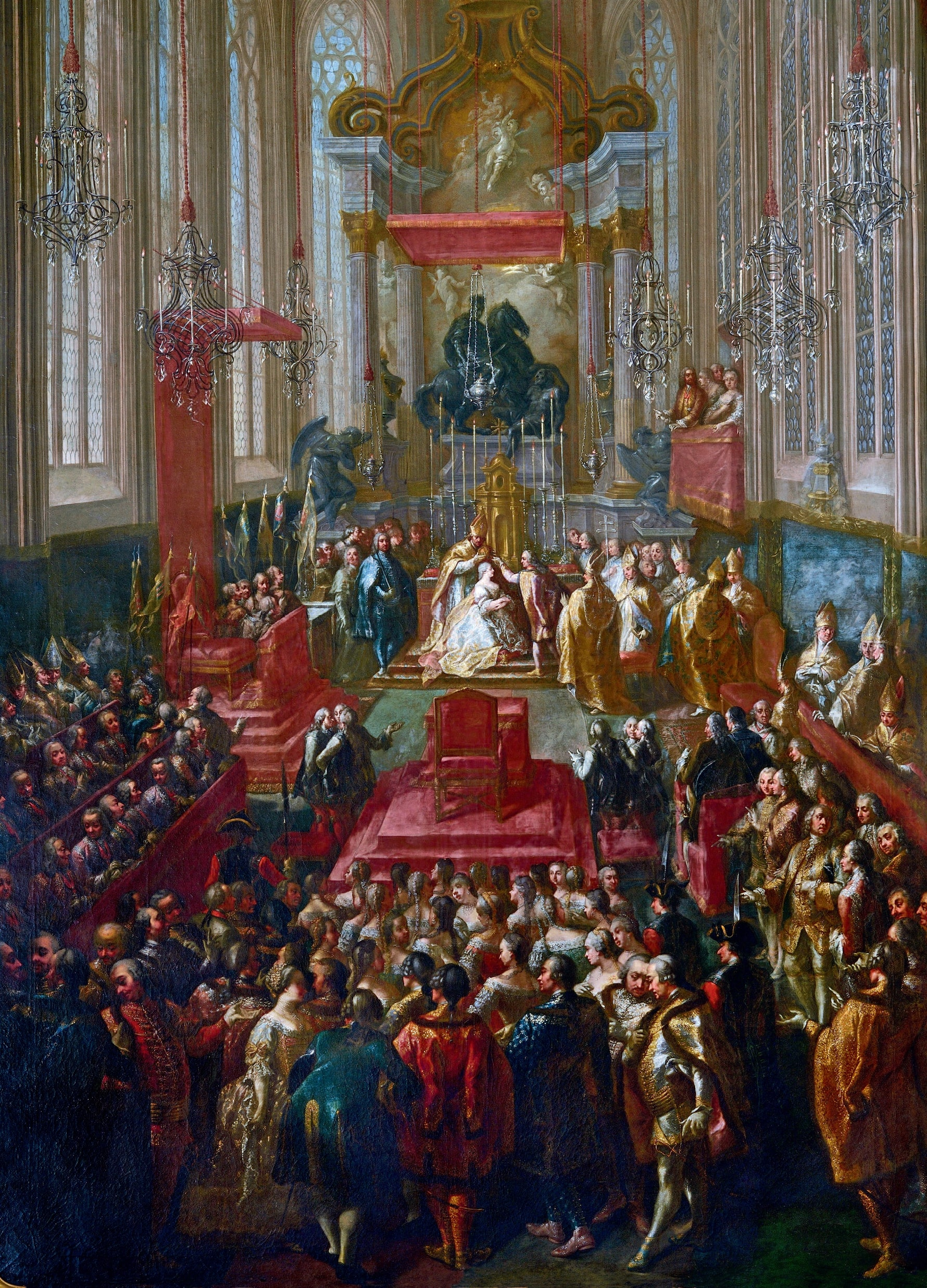
Maria Theresa being crowned Queen of Hungary, St Martin's Cathedral, Pressburg

After Austria's failure at Mollwitz to repel the Prussian invasion, other powers were emboldened to attack the beleaguered monarchy, widening the conflict into what would become the War of the Austrian Succession. France declared its support for Prussia's seizure of Silesia in the 5 June Treaty of Breslau, and in July it joined in the Treaty of Nymphenburg, by which France and Spain committed to support Bavaria's territorial claims against Austria. French forces began crossing the Rhine on 15 August, joining the Bavarian forces on the Danube and advancing toward Vienna, while a Spanish–Neapolitan army attacked Austria's holdings in northern Italy. Saxony, formerly an Austrian ally, now joined the French alliance, and Britain declared itself neutral to prevent French or Prussian attacks on Hanover.

Faced with the prospect of a total partition of her realm, Maria Theresa worked through the following months to regroup and prepare a counter-attack. On 25 June she received her formal coronation as Queen of Hungary in Pressburg and began trying to recruit a new army from her eastern lands. In August she offered Frederick concessions in the Low Countries and a cash payment if Prussia would evacuate Silesia, though she was immediately rebuffed. Meanwhile, fresh enemies attacked Austria on multiple fronts: the Franco-Bavarian force seized Linz on 14 September and advanced through Upper Austria, reaching the vicinity of Vienna by October, while Bohemia was simultaneously invaded by the Saxons. Seeing Austria's distress, Frederick opened secret peace negotiations with Neipperg in Breslau, even as he continued to publicly support the League of Nymphenburg.

Although Prussia was allied with the French, the idea of France or Bavaria becoming the dominant power in Germany through Austria's destruction did not appeal to Frederick. With British urging and mediation, on 9 October Austria and Prussia agreed to a secret armistice known as the Convention of Klein Schnellendorf, under which both belligerents would cease hostilities in Silesia (though maintaining their appearance), and Austria would eventually concede Lower Silesia in return for a final peace to be negotiated before the end of the year. Neipperg's Austrian forces were then recalled from Silesia to defend Austria against the western invaders, abandoning Neisse after a sham siege in early November and leaving the whole of Silesia under Prussian control.

=== Bohemia–Moravia campaign of 1741–42 ===
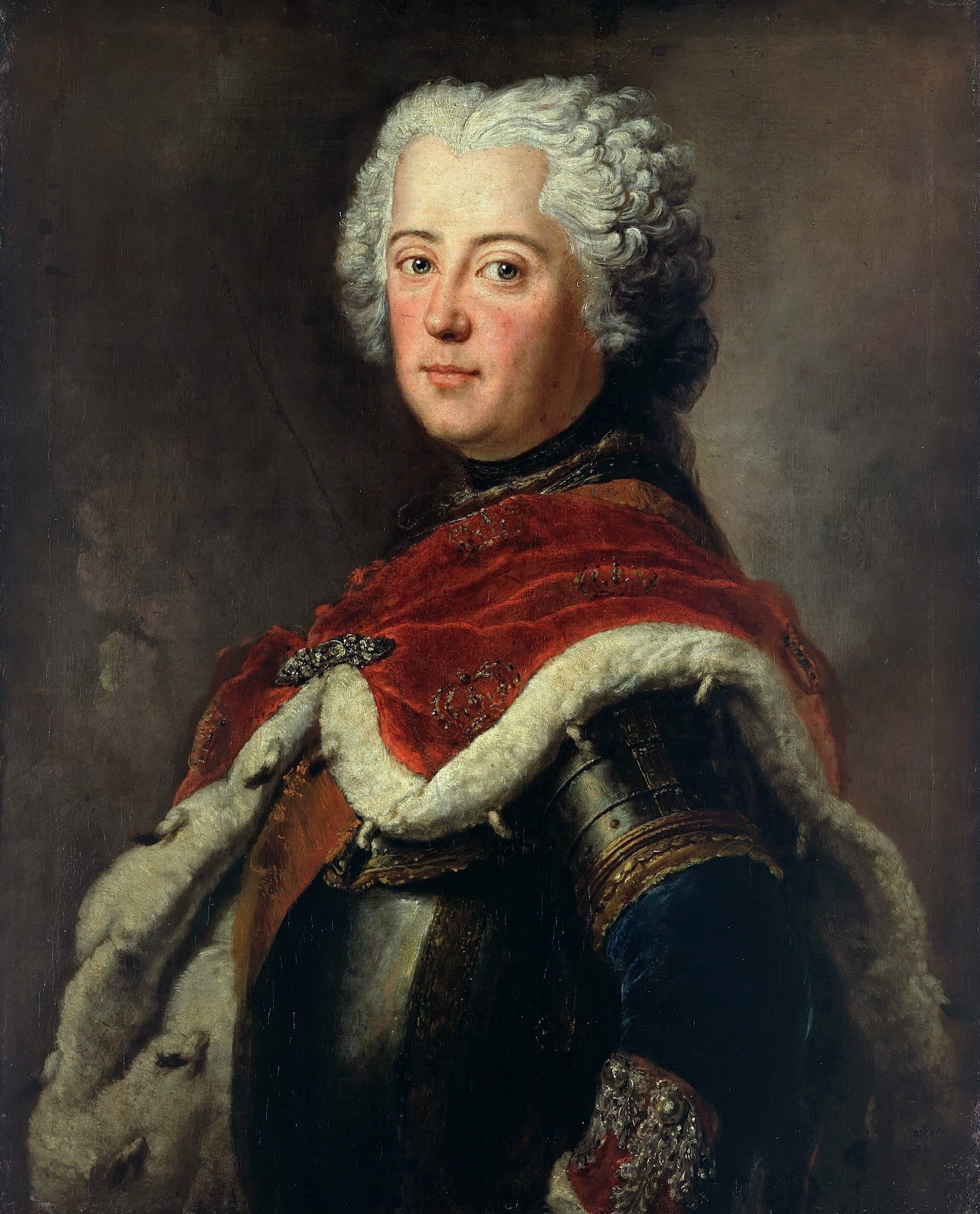
Frederick II of Prussia as crown prince in 1739, by Antoine Pesne

In mid-October, Charles Albert of Bavaria and his French allies were encamped near Vienna, ready to besiege it, but he became concerned that Saxony and Prussia would seize parts of Bohemia, which he had also claimed. The French also deprecated a decisive move on Vienna, wishing to see Austria reduced rather than destroyed. So, on 24 October their forces turned north to march instead on Prague. The Bavarian, French and Saxon armies converged in November, besieging it and ultimately storming it on 26 November; Charles Albert went on to proclaim himself King of Bohemia on 7 December. Meanwhile, in early November Frederick negotiated the border between putative territories of Prussian Silesia and Saxon Moravia with Frederick Augustus of Saxony, also securing French and Bavarian support for his seizure of the entirety of Silesia, along with the Bohemian County of Glatz.

As the Franco-Bavarian allies made territorial gains, Frederick became concerned that Prussia might be sidelined in the eventual peace agreement, so he repudiated the Convention of Klein Schnellendorf, accusing the Austrians of violating its secrecy, and joined the general advance southward into Bohemia and Moravia. In December Schwerin's army advanced through the Sudetes into Moravia, occupying the capital at Olmütz on 27 December, while Prince Leopold's army besieged the fortress at Glatz on the edge of Bohemia. In January 1742 the Imperial election was held at Frankfurt, where Bavarian Elector Charles Albert was chosen as the next Holy Roman Emperor.

In early 1742 Frederick organised a joint advance through Moravia toward Vienna with the Saxons and French, which began after their forces met on 5 February at Wischau. The French, however, proved reluctant and uncooperative allies, and, after the seizure of Iglau on 15 February, they withdrew into Bohemia. The Prussians and Saxons marched on toward Brünn, the main Austrian stronghold remaining in Moravia, but they made little progress due to the substantial Austrian garrison and a shortage of supplies. The Saxons abandoned the effort on 30 March and returned to Bohemia, where they would remain until withdrawing completely from the war in July. The Moravian campaign achieved no significant gains, and on 5 April the Prussians retreated into Bohemia and Upper Silesia.

As the Moravian advance collapsed, Charles Alexander of Lorraine (Maria Theresa's brother-in-law) led a reinforced Austro-Hungarian army of 30,000 through Moravia toward Bohemia, hoping to disperse the Prussians and liberate Prague. In early May, a Prussian army of 28,000 led by Frederick and Prince Leopold marched into the plains of the Elbe south-east of Prague, manoeuvring to block the Austrian advance. The two armies met when Charles's Austrians attacked Prince Leopold's camp near the village of Chotusitz on 17 May; the resulting Battle of Chotusitz ended in a narrow Prussian victory, with substantial casualties on both sides. Prince Charles's defeat at Chotusitz, followed shortly by the defeat of another Austrian army at the Battle of Sahay on 24 May, left Prague securely in the invaders' hands and Austria with no immediate means of driving them out of Bohemia.

=== Treaties of Breslau and Berlin ===
Austrian Silesia after the Treaty of Berlin (1742)

In the aftermath of Chotusitz, Prussia intensified its efforts to reach a separate peace with Austria, and negotiators from the two belligerents met again in Breslau in late May. Frederick now demanded almost the whole of Silesia, as well as the County of Glatz; Maria Theresa was reluctant to make such concessions, but the British envoy, Lord Hyndford, pressed her to make peace with Prussia and concentrate her forces against the French. The British treasury had financed much of Austria's war effort through cash subsidies meant to weaken France, and Hyndford threatened to withdraw Britain's support if Maria Theresa refused to concede Silesia. The two belligerents eventually reached an agreement in the 11 June Treaty of Breslau, which ended the First Silesian War.

Under this treaty, Austria conceded to Prussia the large majority of Silesia along with the Bohemian County of Glatz, territories which would later be consolidated to form the Prussian Province of Silesia. Austria retained the remainder of Bohemia and two small portions of the extreme southern end of Silesia, including the Duchy of Teschen and parts of the Duchies of Jägerndorf, Troppau, and Neisse; these lands would later be combined to form the crown land of Austrian Silesia. Prussia also agreed to take on some of Austria's debts that had been secured against assets in Silesia, as well as committing to remain neutral for the remainder of the ongoing War of the Austrian Succession. This arrangement was formalised and confirmed in the Treaty of Berlin, signed 28 July 1742.

== Outcomes ==
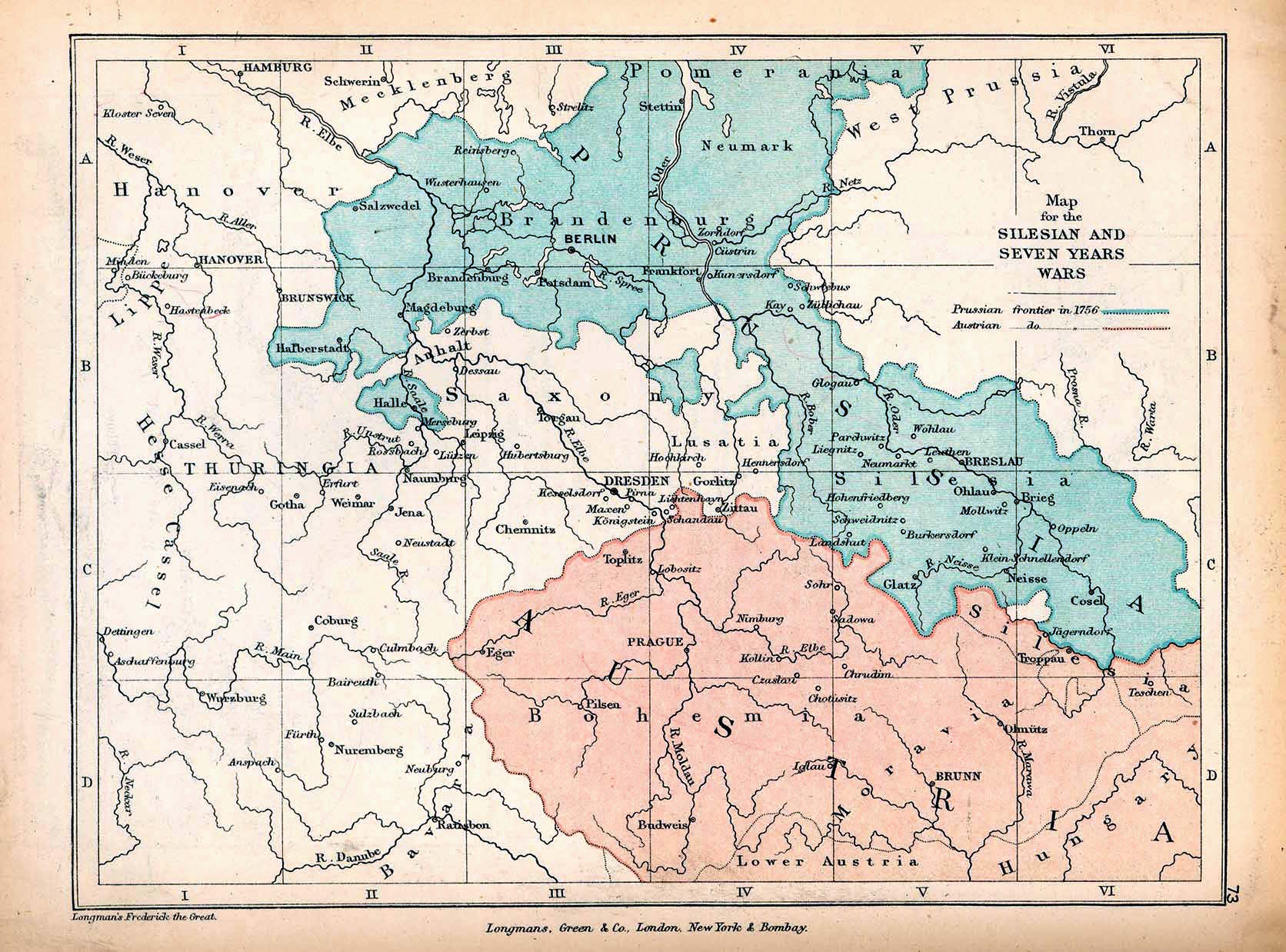
The Central European borders of Prussia (blue-green) and the Habsburg monarchy (red) in 1756, after Prussia's seizure of Silesia in the First Silesian War

The First Silesian War ended in a clear victory for Prussia, which secured some 35,000 square kilometres (14,000 mi^{2}) of new territory and around a million new subjects, greatly enhancing its resources and prestige. However, by twice making a separate peace while the War of the Austrian Succession raged on, Frederick abandoned his erstwhile allies in the League of Nymphenburg and earned a reputation for diplomatic unreliability and double-dealing. With Prussia removed from the wider war, Austria launched a major counter-attack and began regaining lost ground on other fronts, and the diplomatic situation shifted in Austria's favour.

Prussia's seizure of Silesia also ensured continuing conflict with Austria and Saxony. Maria Theresa's determination to recover Silesia would lead to renewed conflict with Prussia in the Second Silesian War only two years later, with a Third Silesian War to follow after another decade; Saxony would take Austria's side in both future conflicts.

=== Prussia ===
In the territorial settlement that ended the war, Prussia gained control of extensive new lands in Glatz and Silesia, a populous and densely industrialised region that would contribute substantial manpower and taxes to the Prussian state. The small kingdom's unexpected victory over the Habsburg monarchy set it apart from German rivals such as Bavaria and Saxony, marking the beginning of Prussia's rise toward the status of a European great power.

The seizure of Silesia made Prussia and Austria into lasting and determined enemies, beginning the Austria–Prussia rivalry that would come to dominate German politics over the next century. Saxony, envious of Prussia's ascendancy and threatened by Prussian Silesia's geostrategic position, also turned its foreign policy firmly against Prussia. Frederick's unilateral withdrawal from the Nymphenburg alliance (and its repetition at the end of the Second Silesian War) angered the French court, and his next perceived "betrayal" (a defensive alliance with Britain under the 1756 Convention of Westminster) accelerated France's eventual realignment toward Austria in the Diplomatic Revolution of the 1750s.

=== Austria ===
The Treaties of Breslau and Berlin cost the Habsburg monarchy its wealthiest province, and capitulating to a lesser German prince significantly dented the Habsburg Monarchy's prestige. The House of Habsburg was also defeated in the Imperial election, calling into question its pre-eminence within Germany. The Austrian army had found itself outmatched by the more disciplined Prussians, and in late 1741 the Nymphenburg alliance had threatened the Habsburg monarchy with disaster.

However, peace in the Silesian theatre gave the Austrian forces a free hand to reverse the gains made by the French and Bavarians the previous year. The western invaders were driven back up the Danube Valley in early 1742, and Saxony withdrew its forces from Bohemia after the Treaty of Berlin, making peace with Austria near the end of the year. The Franco-Bavarian forces occupying Prague were isolated and besieged, eventually giving up the city in December. By mid-1743, Austria would recover control of Bohemia, drive the French back across the Rhine into Alsace, and occupy Bavaria, exiling Emperor Charles VII to Frankfurt.

== Sources ==
- Anderson, Matthew Smith (1995). The War of the Austrian Succession: 1740–1748. New York: Longman. ISBN 978-0-582-05950-4.
- Asprey, Robert B. (1986). Frederick the Great: The Magnificent Enigma. New York: Ticknor and Fields. ISBN 978-0-89919-352-6.
- Black, Jeremy (1994). European Warfare, 1660–1815. London: UCL Press. ISBN 978-1-85728-172-9.
- Black, Jeremy (2002). European International Relations 1648–1815. London: Palgrave Macmillan. ISBN 978-0-333-96450-7.
- Browning, Reed (1993). The War of the Austrian Succession. New York: St. Martin's Press. ISBN 978-0-312-09483-6.
- Browning, Reed (April 2005). "New Views on the Silesian Wars". Journal of Military History. 69 (2): 521–534. doi:10.1353/jmh.2005.0077. JSTOR 3397409. S2CID 159463824.
- Carlyle, Thomas (1858). Book III – The Hohenzollerns in Brandenburg – 1412–1718. History of Friedrich II of Prussia, Called Frederick the Great. Vol. I. London: Chapman & Hall. OCLC 1045538020.
- Carlyle, Thomas (1862a). Book XII – First Silesian War, Awakening a General European One, Begins – December 1740 – May 1741. History of Friedrich II of Prussia, Called Frederick the Great. Vol. III. London: Chapman & Hall. OCLC 1045538020.
- Carlyle, Thomas (1862b). Book XIII – First Silesian War, Leaving the General European One Ablaze All Round, Gets Ended – May 1741 – July 1742. History of Friedrich II of Prussia, Called Frederick the Great. Vol. III. London: Chapman & Hall. OCLC 1045538020.
- Clark, Christopher (2006). Iron Kingdom: The Rise and Downfall of Prussia, 1600–1947. Cambridge, Massachusetts: Belknap Press. ISBN 978-0-674-02385-7.
- Clifford, John Herbert (1914). The Standard History of the World, by Great Historians. Vol. V. New York: University Society. OCLC 867881191.
- Crankshaw, Edward (1970). Maria Theresa. New York: Viking Press. ISBN 978-0-670-45631-4.
- Creveld, Martin van (1977). Supplying War: Logistics from Wallenstein to Patton. Cambridge: Cambridge University Press. ISBN 978-0-521-21730-9.
- Fraser, David (2000). Frederick the Great: King of Prussia. London: Allen Lane. ISBN 978-0-7139-9377-6.
- Hirsch, Theodor (1881). "Johann Georg, Markgraf von Brandenburg". In von Liliencron, Rochus (ed.). Allgemeine Deutsche Biographie. Allgemeine Deutsche Biographie (in German). Vol. XIV. Leipzig: Duncker & Humblot. pp. 175–176. OCLC 309922855.
- Hochedlinger, Michael (2003). Austria's Wars of Emergence: War, State and Society in the Habsburg Monarchy, 1683–1797. London: Longman. ISBN 978-0-582-29084-6.
- Holborn, Hajo (1982). A History of Modern Germany: 1648–1840. Princeton, New Jersey: Princeton University Press. ISBN 978-0-691-00796-0.
- Luvaas, Jay (2009). "Frederick and the Art of War". Frederick the Great on the Art of War. By Friedrich II, King of Prussia. Luvaas, Jay (ed.). New York: Da Capo Press. ISBN 978-0-7867-4977-5.
- Schweizer, Karl W. (1989). England, Prussia, and the Seven Years War: Studies in Alliance Policies and Diplomacy. Lewiston, New York: Edwin Mellen Press. ISBN 978-0-88946-465-0.
- Shennan, J. H. (2005). International Relations in Europe, 1689–1789. London: Taylor & Francis. ISBN 978-0-415-07780-4.
