= Second Silesian War =

1744–45 war between Prussia and Austria

- Part of the War of the Austrian Succession and the Silesian Wars
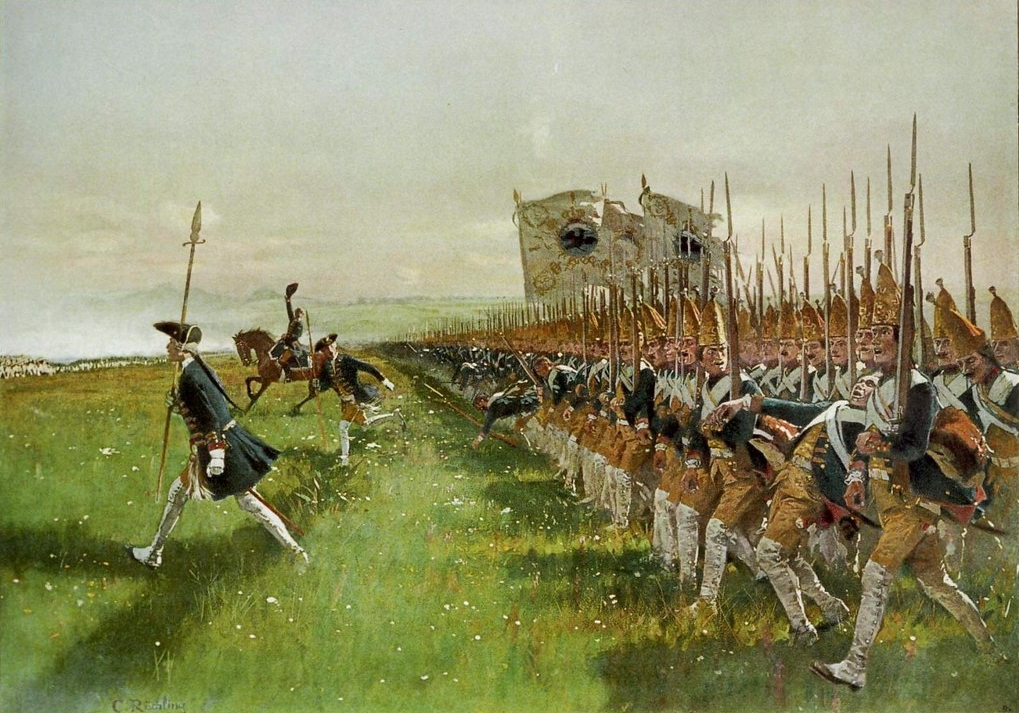
- A Prussian infantry advance during the Battle of Hohenfriedberg, as depicted by Carl Röchling
Date	7 August 1744 – 25 December 1745
Location	Silesia, Bohemia, Upper Saxony
Result	Prussian victory

Belligerents
Prussia	Habsburg monarchy Saxony

Commanders and leaders
(Kingdom of Prussia) Frederick II; (Kingdom of Prussia) Kurt von Schwerin; (Kingdom of Prussia) Leopold I; (Kingdom of Prussia) Leopold II; (Kingdom of Prussia) Hans von Zieten	(Habsburg monarchy) Maria Theresa; (Habsburg monarchy) Charles Alexander; (Habsburg monarchy) Otto von Traun; (Electorate of Saxony) Augustus III; (Electorate of Saxony) Frederick Rutowsky; (Electorate of Saxony) Johann Adolf II

The Second Silesian War (German: Zweiter Schlesischer Krieg) was a war between Prussia and Austria that lasted from 1744 to 1745 and confirmed Prussia's control of the region of Silesia (now in south-western Poland). The war was fought mainly in Silesia, Bohemia, and Upper Saxony and formed one theatre of the wider War of the Austrian Succession. It was the second of three Silesian Wars fought between Frederick the Great's Prussia and Maria Theresa's Austria in the mid-18th century, all three of which ended in Prussian control of Silesia.

The conflict has been viewed as a continuation of the First Silesian War, which had concluded only two years before. After the Treaty of Berlin ended hostilities between Austria and Prussia in 1742, the Habsburg monarchy's fortunes improved greatly in the continuing War of the Austrian Succession. As Austria expanded its alliances with the 1743 Treaty of Worms, Prussia entered a renewed alliance with Austria's enemies in the League of Frankfurt and rejoined the war, hoping to prevent a resurgent Austria from taking back Silesia.

The war began with a Prussian invasion of Habsburg Bohemia in mid-1744, and ended in a Prussian victory with the Treaty of Dresden in December 1745, which confirmed Prussian control of Silesia. Continuing conflict over Silesia would draw Austria and Prussia into a Third Silesian War a decade later. The Second Silesian War repeated the defeat of the Habsburg monarchy by a lesser German power and contributed to the Austria–Prussia rivalry that shaped German politics for more than a century.

== Context and causes ==
=== First Silesian War ===
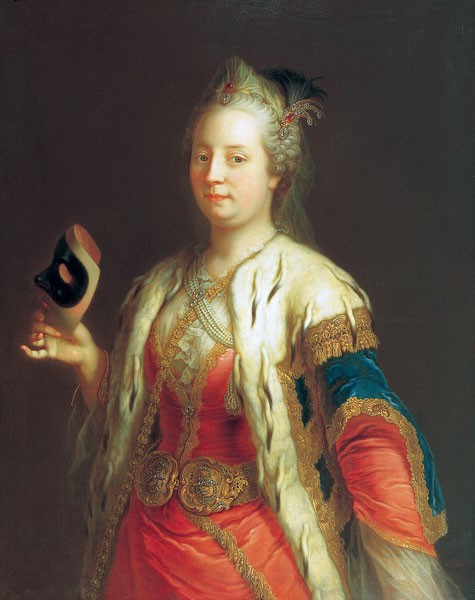
Maria Theresa of Austria c. 1744, by Martin van Meytens

Charles VI, Holy Roman Emperor of the House of Habsburg died in 1740 without a male heir; he was succeeded by his eldest daughter, who became ruler of the Archduchy of Austria, as well as of the Bohemian and Hungarian lands within the Habsburg monarchy, as Queen Maria Theresa. During Emperor Charles VI's lifetime, this female succession was generally acknowledged by the imperial states, but when he died it was promptly contested by several parties. The newly crowned King Frederick II of Prussia took this Austrian succession crisis as an opportunity to press his dynasty's territorial claims in the Habsburg crown land of Silesia, invading in December 1740 and beginning the First Silesian War.

After early Prussian successes, other powers were emboldened to attack the beleaguered Habsburg realm, widening the conflict into what became the War of the Austrian Succession. Prussia, France, Spain, Bavaria and others formed an alliance known as the League of Nymphenburg to support each other's efforts to seize Habsburg territory and Bavaria's bid for the imperial election. The allies invaded on multiple fronts in mid-1741, soon occupying Austrian Tyrol, Upper Austria and Bohemia, and even threatening Vienna. Faced with a potential war of partition, Austria negotiated a secret armistice with Prussia in October and redeployed its forces to face its other enemies.

Prussian forces resumed offensive operations in December, invading Moravia and blocking an Austrian drive toward Prague in early 1742. Elector Charles Albert of Bavaria won the 1742 Imperial election and became Holy Roman Emperor. In July 1742 Prussia and Austria made a separate peace in the Treaty of Berlin, under which Austria ceded the majority of Silesia to Prussia in return for Prussia's neutrality in the continuing war. In late 1742, while Prussia enjoyed the restored peace and worked to assimilate Silesia into its administration and economy, Austria fought on against Bavaria and France, reversing its losses from 1741. By the middle of 1743 Austria had recovered control of Bohemia, driven the French back across the Rhine into Alsace, and occupied Bavaria, exiling Emperor Charles VII to Frankfurt. Prussia's withdrawal from the War of the Austrian Succession under a separate peace embittered its erstwhile allies, and the diplomatic position shifted in Austria's favour.

=== Preparations for a second war ===
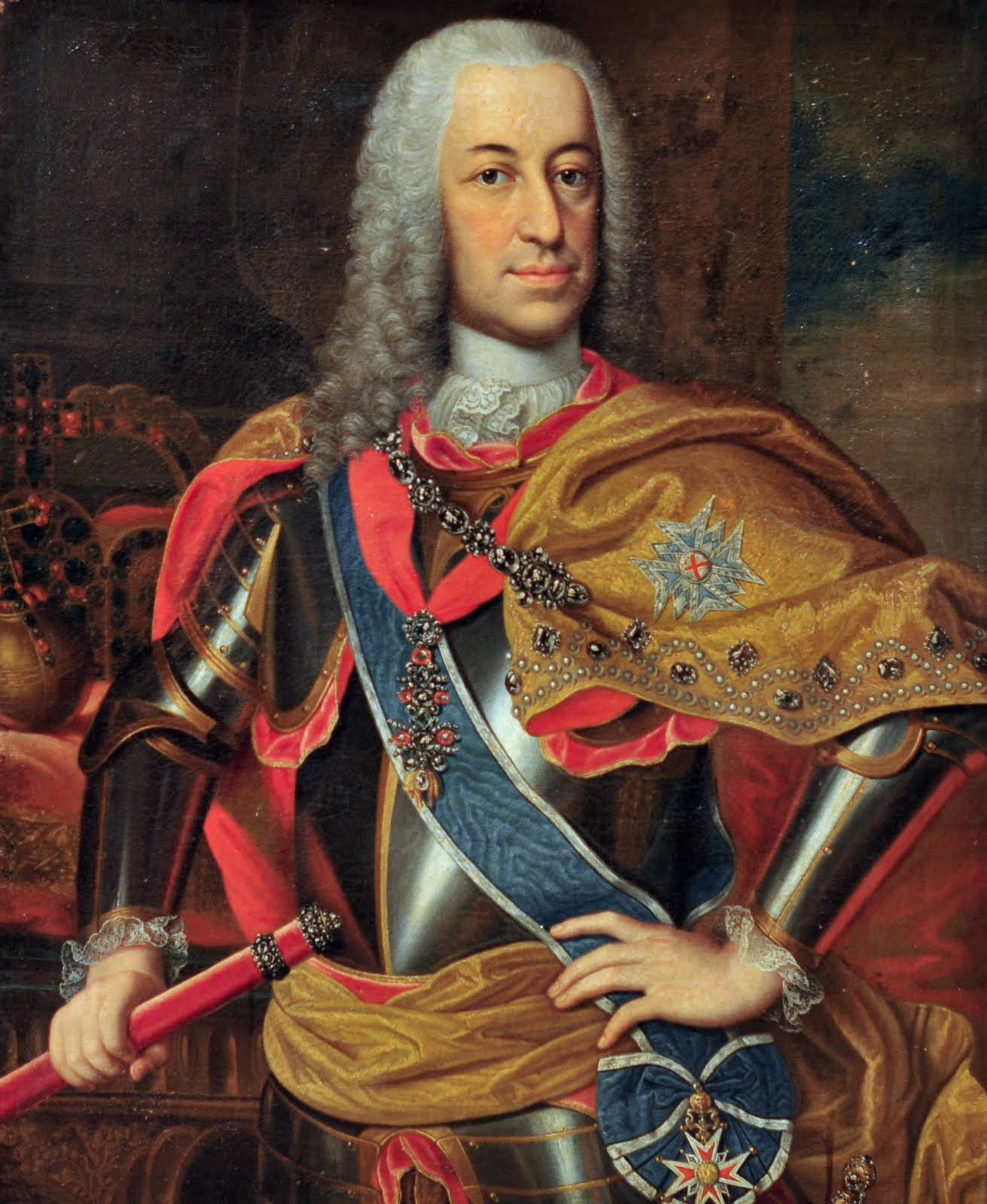
Charles Albert of Bavaria as Holy Roman Emperor, by Georg Desmarées

In September 1743 Austria, Britain–Hanover, and Savoy–Sardinia concluded a new alliance under the Treaty of Worms; Britain had previously recognised Prussia's acquisition of Silesia as the mediator of the Treaty of Berlin, but this new alliance made no mention of that guarantee. Meanwhile, the Russo-Swedish War that had paralleled the First Silesian War ended in August 1743, freeing Russia to potentially take Austria's side in the ongoing succession war. The following year, Empress Elizabeth of Russia appointed as her chancellor Alexey Bestuzhev, a proponent of a pro-British and anti-French policy that entailed friendship to Austria and enmity to Prussia. Prussia sought warmer relations with Russia and briefly won a minor defensive agreement, but Russia posed a growing threat to Prussia's eastern frontier.

Frederick was apprehensive that an irresistible anti-Prussian coalition might soon develop between Britain–Hanover, Saxony, Russia and Austria. He viewed the Peace of Breslau as little more than another armistice with Austria, and he needed to prevent Maria Theresa from taking revenge at her convenience when the war elsewhere was concluded. Frederick decided that Prussia must restore its French alliance, build an anti-Austrian coalition with as many other German princes as possible, and then re-enter the war by striking first against Austria. So, in late 1743 and early 1744 Prussia conducted negotiations with France, Bavaria and other German princes to build a coalition to support the Emperor.

On 22 May 1744 Prussia formed an alliance with Bavaria, Sweden, Hesse–Kassel and the Electoral Palatinate known as the League of Frankfurt, whose announced aim was to recover and defend the territories of Emperor Charles VII, including Bohemia (where he had been proclaimed king in 1742). A parallel treaty with France was concluded on 5 June, under which France committed to support the League and attack the Austrian Netherlands. Prussia would champion the Emperor's cause by invading Bohemia from the north, a service for which the Emperor committed to cede the portions of Bohemia northeast of the Elbe to Prussia. Meanwhile, the main Austrian force under Prince Charles Alexander of Lorraine would be occupied by the French in Alsace, where the French would counterattack on the opposite front as Prince Charles's army was pulled in two directions.

Maria Theresa pursued the same goals she had from the beginning of the War of the Austrian Succession: first, she needed to compel a general recognition of the Pragmatic Sanction of 1713 and her right to rule the Habsburg lands; second, she wanted to achieve the election of her husband, Francis Stephen of Lorraine, as Holy Roman Emperor; third, she hoped to recover and preserve control of the contested Habsburg crown lands of Bohemia and Silesia. As soon as the Franco–Bavarian threat from the west could be defeated, Austria intended to resume hostilities in Silesia and drive out the Prussians, restoring the borders of the territories Maria Theresa had inherited. On 7 August Prussia declared its intervention in the Austrian war on behalf of Emperor Charles VII, beginning the Second Silesian War.

=== Methods and technologies ===
European warfare in the early modern period was characterised by the widespread adoption of firearms in combination with more traditional bladed weapons. Eighteenth-century European armies were built around units of massed infantry armed with smoothbore flintlock muskets and bayonets. Cavalrymen were equipped with sabres and pistols or carbines; light cavalry were used principally for reconnaissance, screening and tactical communications, while heavy cavalry were used as tactical reserves and deployed for shock attacks. Smoothbore artillery provided fire support and played the leading role in siege warfare. Strategic warfare in this period centred around control of key fortifications positioned so as to command the surrounding regions and roads, with lengthy sieges a common feature of armed conflict. Decisive field battles were relatively rare, though they played a larger part in Frederick's theory of warfare than was typical among his contemporary rivals.

The Silesian Wars, like most European wars of the 18th century, were fought as so-called cabinet wars in which disciplined regular armies were equipped and supplied by the state to conduct warfare on behalf of the sovereign's interests. Occupied enemy territories were regularly taxed and extorted for funds, but large-scale atrocities against civilian populations were rare compared with conflicts in the previous century. Military logistics was the decisive factor in many wars, as armies had grown too large to support themselves on prolonged campaigns by foraging and plunder alone. Military supplies were stored in centralised magazines and distributed by baggage trains that were highly vulnerable to enemy raids. Armies were generally unable to sustain combat operations during winter and normally established winter quarters in the cold season, resuming their campaigns with the return of spring.

== Course ==
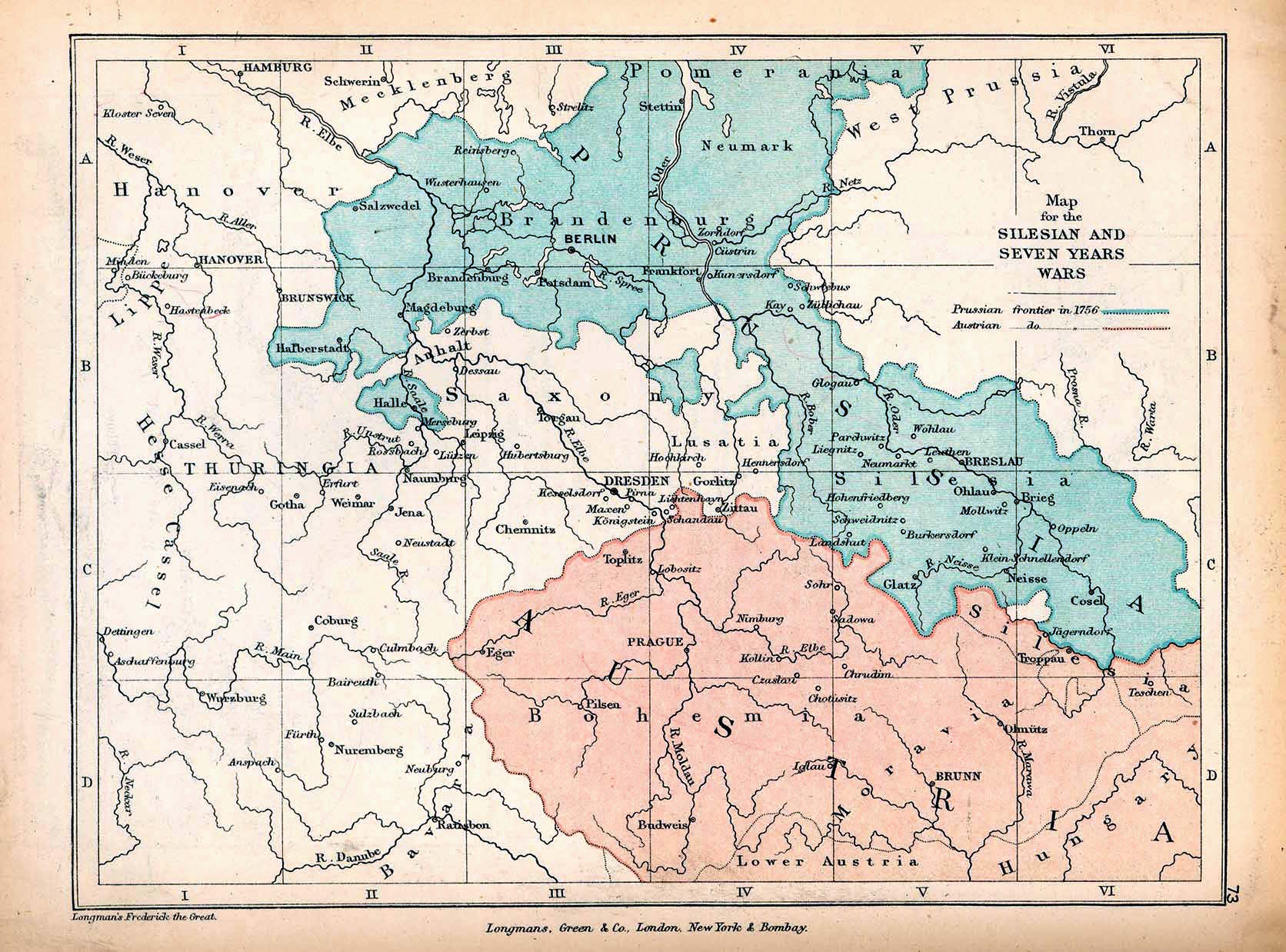
The Central European borders of Brandenburg–Prussia (blue-green) and the Habsburg monarchy (red) after Prussia's seizure of Silesia in the First Silesian War

=== Bohemian campaign of 1744 ===
Frederick led Prussian soldiers across the frontier into Bohemia on 15 August 1744. The invading army of around 70,000 men entered Bohemia in three columns: the eastern column, led by Count Kurt von Schwerin, advanced from Silesia through Glatz and across the Giant Mountains; the central column, led by Leopold of Anhalt-Dessau, marched through Saxony (with an order from the Emperor guaranteeing safe conduct), passing through Lusatia and advancing to Leitmeritz; the western column, led by Frederick himself, advanced up the Elbe through Dresden and across the Ore Mountains to Leitmeritz. After entering Bohemia, all three forces converged on Prague by the beginning of September, surrounding and besieging the Bohemian capital. The city underwent a week of heavy artillery bombardment, eventually surrendering to the Prussians on 16 September.

Frederick left a modest garrison in Prague and quickly marched on to the south, occupying Tábor, České Budějovice and Hluboká. As expected, this new threat drew the Austrian army under Prince Charles back from Alsace through Bavaria; the French, however, failed to harass and disrupt the Austrian redeployment as they had promised, owing in part to King Louis XV falling seriously ill while overseeing the defence at Metz. Consequently, Prince Charles's army was able to return to Bohemia quickly, in good order and at full strength, though it was forced to abandon control of Alsace and Bavaria. Austrian diplomats also persuaded Saxony to re-enter the conflict on Austria's side, though in a strictly defensive role. By early October the Austrians were advancing through southwestern Bohemia toward Prague, while a Saxon army marched from the northwest to support them.

Learning of the Austrians' rapid approach and unexpected strength, Frederick began pulling his forces back from south-eastern Bohemia to face the oncoming foes. Frederick tried repeatedly to force a decisive engagement, but Austrian commander Otto Ferdinand von Traun manoeuvred away from all Prussian advances while continually harassing the invaders' supply lines, and the Prussians' supplies ran low in the hostile province. By early November the Prussians were forced to retreat to Prague and the Elbe, and after some weeks of manoeuvre an Austrian–Saxon force crossed the Elbe on 19 November. At this point the Prussians abandoned Prague and gave up Bohemia, retreating in poor morale into Upper Silesia, which they defended through the winter against Austrian incursions.

=== Early 1745: Bavarian defeat ===
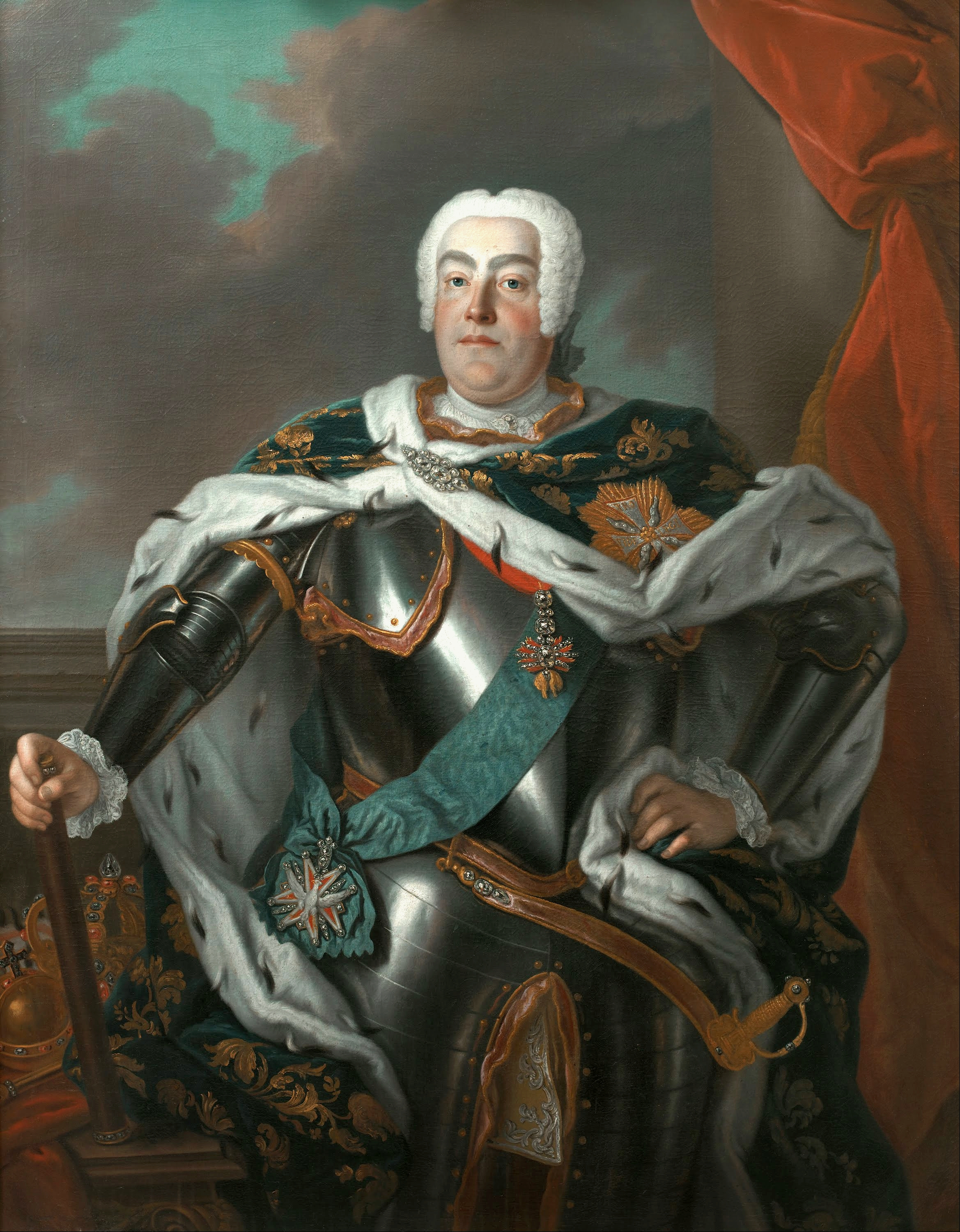
Frederick Augustus II of Saxony and Poland, by Louis de Silvestre

On 8 January 1745 Austria further strengthened its diplomatic position with the Treaty of Warsaw, which established a new "Quadruple Alliance" between Austria, Britain–Hanover, Saxony, and the Dutch Republic, aimed at opposing the League of Frankfurt and restoring the traditional borders of the Habsburg Monarchy. Prince-Elector Frederick Augustus II of Poland–Saxony now committed 30,000 troops to the cause in return for cash subsidies from the British and Dutch. This publicly defensive alliance was soon followed by a secret offensive agreement between Austria and Saxony, signed on 18 May in Leipzig, which envisioned a territorial partition of Prussia. Meanwhile, as Austrian forces withdrew from Bavaria to respond to the Prussian invasion of Bohemia, Emperor Charles VII recovered control of his capital at Munich, only to die shortly after relocating there on 20 January, destroying the rationale behind Frederick's alliance. These events combined to produce a major shift in the direction of the war in Germany.

With Prussia's forces driven out of Bohemia, Austria renewed its offensive against Bavaria in March 1745, swiftly over-running the defences that had been re-established there during the winter. On 15 April the Austrians under Károly József Batthyány decisively defeated the Franco-Bavarian army at the Battle of Pfaffenhofen and drove the allied forces entirely out of Bavaria. After this defeat, Maximilian III Joseph, Elector of Bavaria (the son of the late Emperor Charles VII) made peace with Maria Theresa by the Treaty of Füssen on 22 April. In the treaty, Maximilian abandoned his father's claims on Austrian lands and promised to support Francis Stephen of Lorraine in the forthcoming imperial election; in return, Maria Theresa retroactively recognised Charles VII's legitimacy as Holy Roman Emperor. This closed the Bavarian theatre of the War of the Austrian Succession, allowing Austria to concentrate its forces on the remaining fronts in Silesia, Italy, and the Netherlands.

=== Mid-1745: Battles of Hohenfriedberg and Soor ===
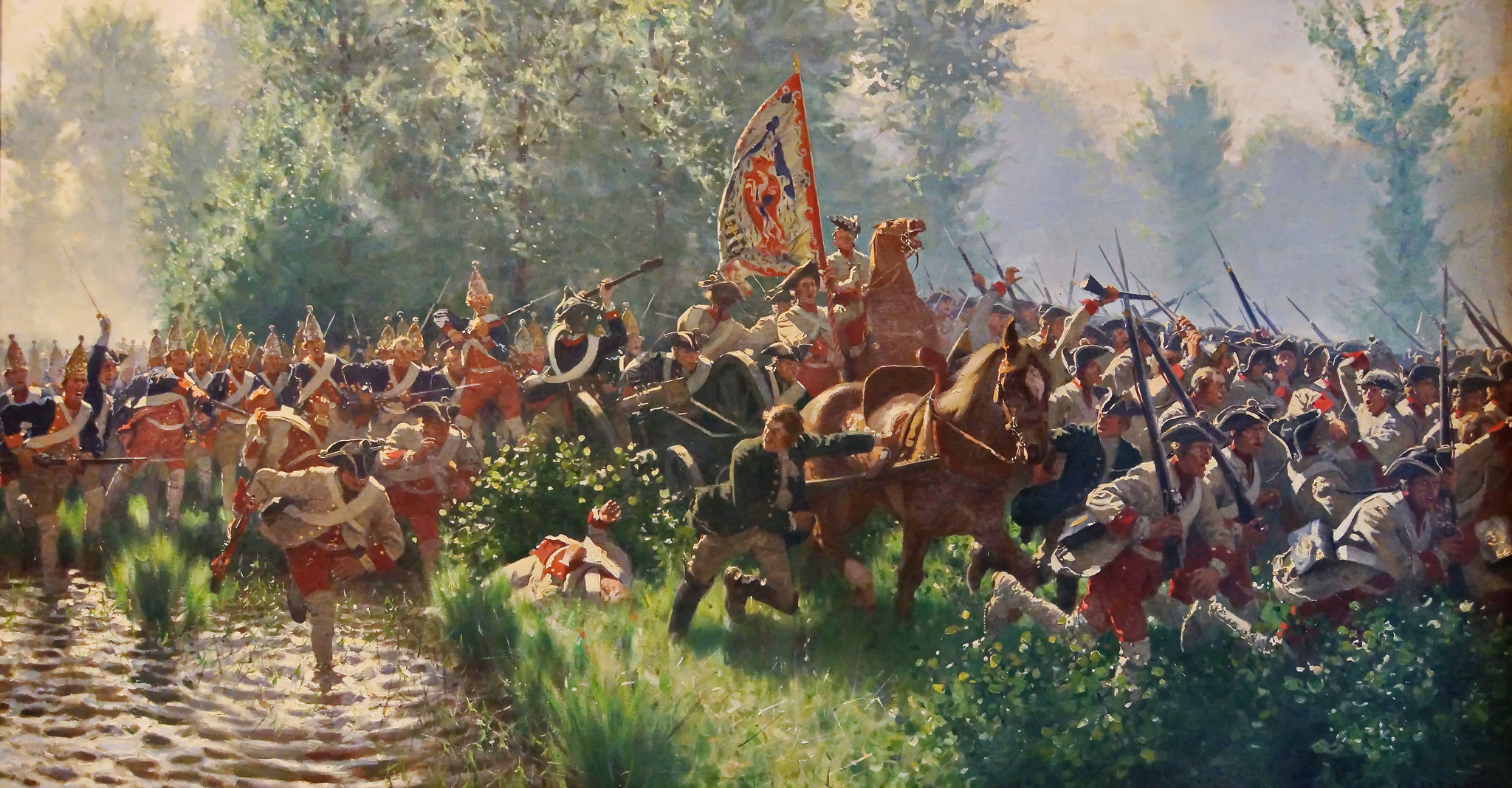
Prussian grenadiers over-running Saxon forces during the Battle of Hohenfriedberg, as depicted by Carl Röchling

Having made peace with Bavaria, in late April Austria prepared for a large-scale invasion of Silesia, moving the army of Charles of Lorraine into Moravia, while a Saxon army organised near Leipzig. Frederick abandoned the mountainous southern tip of Upper Silesia to the Austrian vanguard of pandurs, concentrating his defences around the town of Frankenstein in the valley of the Eastern Neisse. Meanwhile, Leopold I, Prince of Anhalt-Dessau was put in command of a smaller force in Brandenburg to prevent a Saxon invasion. At the end of May, the Austrian–Saxon force crossed through the Giant Mountains and camped around the Silesian village of Hohenfriedberg, where Frederick staged a surprise attack on the morning of 4 June. The ensuing Battle of Hohenfriedberg ended in a decisive Prussian victory, sending Prince Charles's army retreating in disarray back into the mountains.

Austria's reversal at Hohenfriedberg removed any immediate prospect of recovering Silesia. The Prussians followed the retreating Austrian–Saxon army into Bohemia, harassing its rear as far as Königgrätz, where the two forces camped on opposite sides of the Elbe. The armies faced off but fought little during the next two months, while Frederick pursued a peace agreement that would again guarantee his control of Silesia. Britain's willingness to subsidise Austria's war against Prussia was greatly reduced by the outbreak of a new Jacobite uprising, and on 26 August Britain and Prussia agreed to the Convention of Hanover, in which both sides recognised each other's German possessions (including Prussian Silesia), and Prussia committed not to seek territorial gains in Bohemia or Saxony in any eventual peace agreement.

On the Austrian side, Maria Theresa negotiated through the middle of the year with the German prince-electors to make her husband Holy Roman Emperor, now that the Bavarian emperor had died. The 1745 Imperial election was held on 13 September in Frankfurt, where Francis Stephen of Lorraine was indeed named Emperor Francis I (despite dissenting votes from Prussia and the Palatinate), achieving one of Maria Theresa's major goals in the war. Meanwhile, supplies had run low in the Prussian camp in Bohemia, and Prussia's forces were gradually pushed back by Austrian probes. On 29 September Prince Charles's army staged a surprise attack on Frederick's camp near the village of Soor; the resulting Battle of Soor ended in a Prussian victory, despite the Austrian surprise and superior numbers. The Prussians' supplies were exhausted, however, and they withdrew again into Upper Silesia for the winter, driving out the Austrian light troops that had entered the region ahead of Prince Charles's main force.

=== Late 1745: Battles of Hennersdorf and Kesselsdorf ===
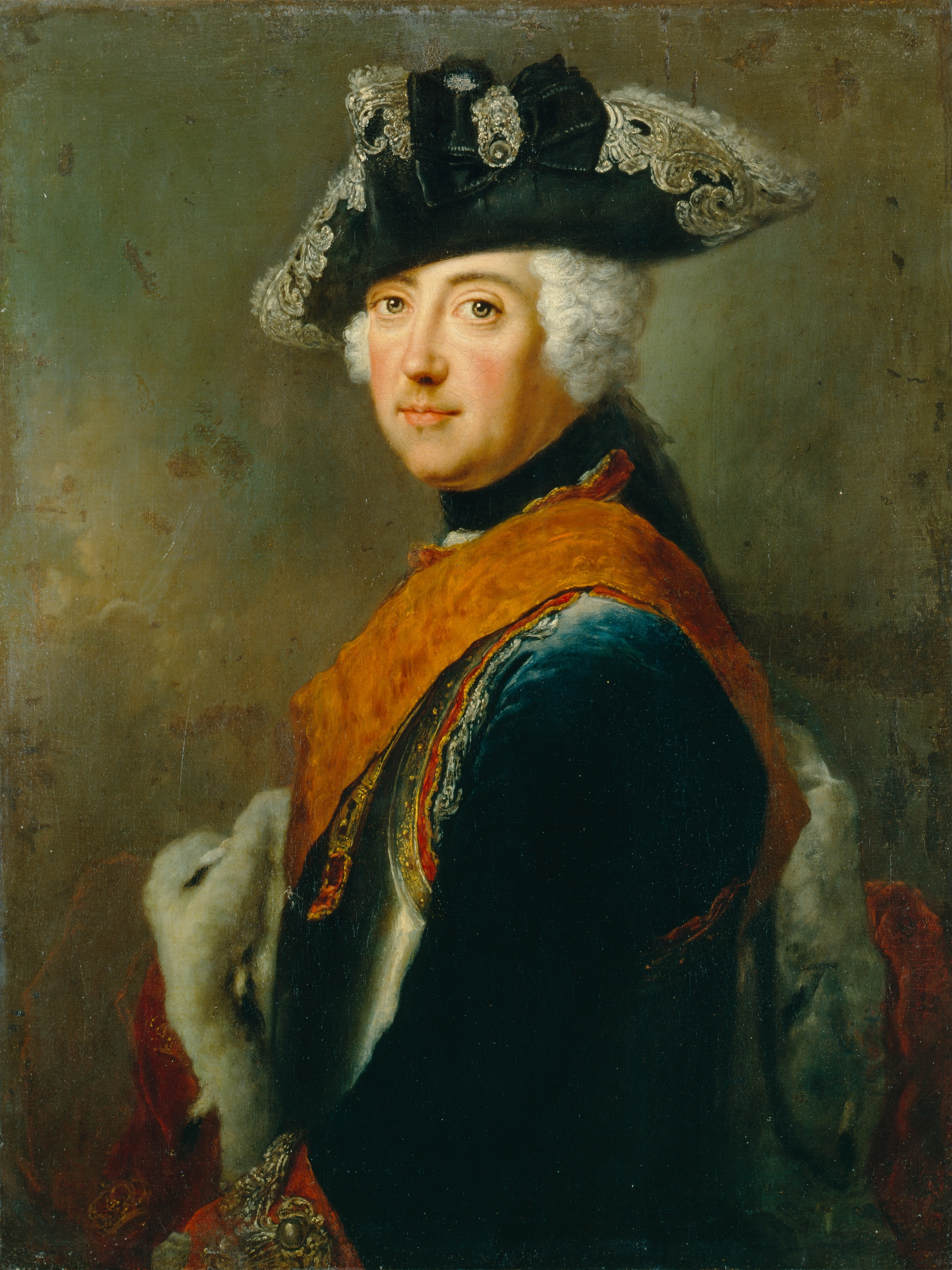
Frederick the Great of Prussia in 1745, by Antoine Pesne

Prussia and Britain hoped the Austrian defeats at Hohenfreidberg and Soor would persuade Austria to come to terms and concentrate its efforts against France, but Maria Theresa was resolved to fight on. On 29 August Austria and Saxony had agreed on a more offensive alliance aimed at seizing Prussian territory, and in early November they began a new offensive from multiple directions toward Brandenburg. Prince Charles's Austrian army marched north from Bohemia toward Lusatia, while the main Saxon army under Frederick Augustus Rutowsky prepared to attack from western Saxony, hoping together to seize Berlin and end the war outright. On 8 November Frederick was informed of these movements and ordered Leopold I to prepare his troops in western Brandenburg, while Frederick himself departed for Lower Silesia to gather forces to meet Charles's advance.

Prussian forces quietly paralleled Prince Charles's march through Lusatia, until the Austrians had come nearly to the Brandenburg border. There, on 23 November Frederick launched a successful surprise attack on Charles's camp at Katholisch Hennersdorf; this Battle of Hennersdorf ended with the Saxon elements of the allied army destroyed and the larger Austrian force confused and scattered. Charles and his remnants were forced to retreat back into central Saxony and Bohemia, leaving Lusatia under Prussian control. Meanwhile, Leopold I's army advanced into western Saxony on 29 November against minimal resistance, progressing as far as Leipzig by the next day and occupying that city. From there, his army and Frederick's converged toward Dresden in early December.

Frederick's force attempted to come between the Saxon capital and Prince Charles's Austrians, while Leopold's army advanced directly upon Rutowsky's Saxons, who were entrenched beside the village of Kesselsdorf. On 15 December Leopold's force attacked and destroyed Rutowsky's army in the Battle of Kesselsdorf, opening the way to Dresden, as Prince Charles and the remaining Saxon soldiers retreated through the Ore Mountains into Bohemia. The Prussians occupied Dresden on 18 December, after which Frederick once again sent envoys to Maria Theresa and Frederick Augustus II to propose peace.

=== Treaty of Dresden ===
Austrian and Saxon delegates and British mediators joined the Prussians in Dresden, where they quickly negotiated a peace treaty. Under the resulting agreement, Maria Theresa acknowledged Prussia's control of Silesia and Glatz, and Frederick retroactively recognised Francis I as Holy Roman Emperor and agreed to the Pragmatic Sanction, while also committing to neutrality for the remainder of the War of the Austrian Succession. For its part in the Austrian alliance, Saxony was compelled to pay one million rixdollars in reparations to Prussia. The region's border were thus confirmed at the status quo ante bellum, which had been Prussia's principal goal. This Treaty of Dresden was signed on 25 December 1745, ending the Second Silesian War between Austria, Saxony, and Prussia.

== Outcomes ==
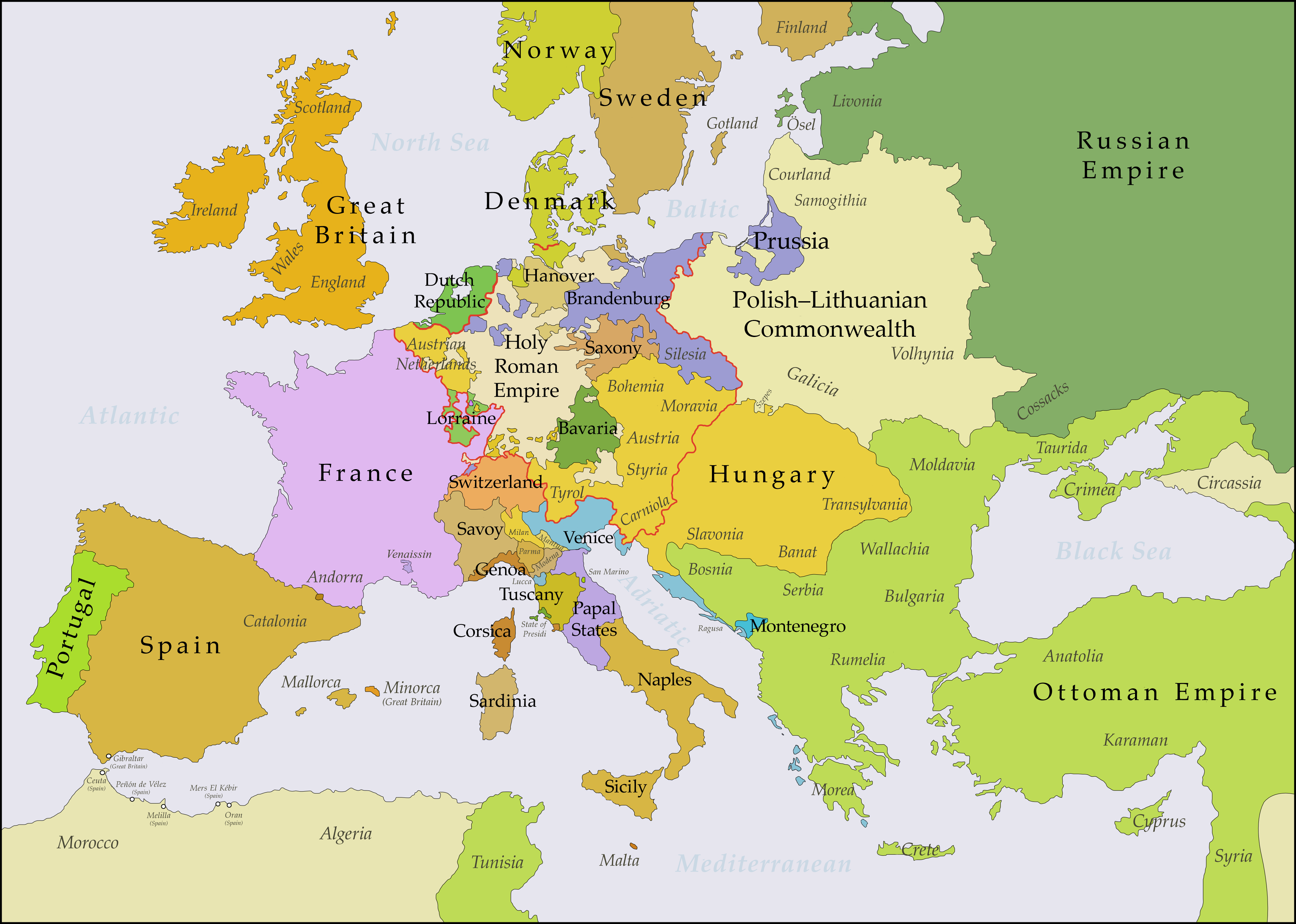
Europe in the years after the Treaty of Aix-la-Chapelle (1748), with Brandenburg–Prussia in violet and the Habsburg monarchy in gold

The First and Second Silesian Wars have been described as campaigns within one continuous War of the Austrian Succession. Partly for this reason, contemporaries and later historians have consistently viewed the Second Silesian War's conclusion as a victory for Prussia, which defended its seizure of Silesia. Prussia's intervention in Bohemia also seriously impeded the Austrian war effort against France. However, by making another separate peace while the French continued to fight the wider War of the Austrian Succession, Frederick damaged his own diplomatic credibility. The Treaty of Dresden also deepened Austria and Saxony's hostility toward Prussia, leading them into the anti-Prussian alliance that would spark the Third Silesian War in the following decade.

=== Prussia ===
By again defeating Austria, Prussia confirmed its acquisition of Silesia, a densely industrialised region with a large population and substantial tax yields. The small kingdom's unexpected victories over the Habsburg monarchy marked the beginning of Prussia's rise toward the status of a European great power, as it began to leave German rivals such as Bavaria and Saxony behind. His series of battlefield victories in 1745 won Frederick general acclaim as a brilliant military commander; it was at the end of this war that he began to be spoken of as "Frederick the Great".

The seizure of Silesia made Prussia and Austria into lasting and determined enemies, beginning the Austria–Prussia rivalry that would come to dominate German politics over the next century. Saxony, envious of Prussia's ascendancy and threatened by Prussian Silesia's geostrategic position, also turned its foreign policy firmly against Prussia. Frederick's repeated unilateral withdrawal from his alliances in the War of the Austrian Succession deepened the French royal court's distrust of him, and his next perceived "betrayal" (a defensive alliance with Britain under the 1756 Convention of Westminster) accelerated France's eventual realignment toward Austria in the Diplomatic Revolution of the 1750s.

=== Austria ===
The Second Silesian War was a disappointment for Austria, whose armed forces proved surprisingly ineffective against smaller Prussian armies. The Treaty of Dresden formalised the loss of the Habsburg monarchy's wealthiest province, and defeat by a lesser German prince significantly dented Habsburg prestige. The rest of the Habsburg patrimony in Central Europe was preserved intact, however, and Maria Theresa did win Prussia's retroactive support for her husband's election as Holy Roman Emperor.

Despite its defeat, Austria was reluctant to recognise Prussia as a rival power and refused to accept the loss of Silesia. When the Treaty of Aix-la-Chapelle finally ended the wider War of the Austrian Succession in 1748, Maria Theresa's government refused to sign the peace agreement because it guaranteed Prussian sovereignty in the conquered province. Instead, she began a general reform of Austria's military and a review of its diplomatic policy, all aimed at one day recovering Silesia and relegating Prussia to the status of a lesser power. This policy eventually led to the formation of a broad anti-Prussian alliance between Austria, France and Russia, followed by the outbreak of the Third Silesian War and the wider Seven Years' War in 1756. The struggle with Prussia would become the driving factor behind wide-ranging efforts to modernise the Habsburg monarchy over the next half century.

== Sources ==
- Asprey, Robert B. (1986). Frederick the Great: The Magnificent Enigma. New York: Ticknor and Fields. ISBN 978-0-89919-352-6.
- Bain, Robert Nisbet (1911). "Bestuzhev-Ryumin, Alexius Petrovich, Count" . In Chisholm, Hugh (ed.). Encyclopædia Britannica. Vol. 3 (11th ed.). Cambridge University Press. pp. 824–626. OCLC 873076959.
- Black, Jeremy (1994). European Warfare, 1660–1815. London: UCL Press. ISBN 978-1-85728-172-9.
- Black, Jeremy (2002). European International Relations 1648–1815. London: Palgrave Macmillan. ISBN 978-0-333-96450-7.
- Browning, Reed (1993). The War of the Austrian Succession. New York: St. Martin's Press. ISBN 978-0-312-09483-6.
- Browning, Reed (April 2005). "New Views on the Silesian Wars". Journal of Military History. 69 (2): 521–534. doi:10.1353/jmh.2005.0077. S2CID 159463824.
- Carlyle, Thomas (1862a). Book XIII—First Silesian War, Leaving the General European One Ablaze All Round, Gets Ended—May 1741 – July 1742. History of Friedrich II of Prussia, Called Frederick the Great. Vol. III. London: Chapman & Hall. OCLC 1045538020.
- Carlyle, Thomas (1862b). Book XIV—The Surrounding European War Does Not End—August 1742 – July 1744. History of Friedrich II of Prussia, Called Frederick the Great. Vol. III. London: Chapman & Hall. OCLC 1045538020.
- Carlyle, Thomas (1864a). Book XV—Second Silesian War, Important Episode in the General European One—15th August 1744 – 25th December 1745. History of Friedrich II of Prussia, Called Frederick the Great. Vol. IV. London: Chapman & Hall. OCLC 1045538020.
- Carlyle, Thomas (1864b). Book XVI—The Ten Years of Peace—1746–1756. History of Friedrich II of Prussia, Called Frederick the Great. Vol. IV. London: Chapman & Hall. OCLC 1045538020.
- Clark, Christopher (2006). Iron Kingdom: The Rise and Downfall of Prussia, 1600–1947. Cambridge, Massachusetts: Belknap Press. ISBN 978-0-674-02385-7.
- Clifford, John Herbert (1914). The Standard History of the World, by Great Historians. Vol. 5. New York: University Society. OCLC 867881191.
- Creveld, Martin van (1977). Supplying War: Logistics from Wallenstein to Patton. Cambridge: Cambridge University Press. ISBN 978-0-521-21730-9.
- Fraser, David (2000). Frederick the Great: King of Prussia. London: Allen Lane. ISBN 978-0-7139-9377-6.
- Hochedlinger, Michael (2003). Austria's Wars of Emergence: War, State and Society in the Habsburg Monarchy, 1683–1797. London: Longman. ISBN 978-0-582-29084-6.
- Holborn, Hajo (1982). A History of Modern Germany: 1648–1840. Princeton, New Jersey: Princeton University Press. ISBN 978-0-691-00796-0.
- Levy, Jack S. (1988). "Analytic Problems in the Identification of Wars". International Interactions. 14 (2): 181–186. doi:10.1080/03050628808434702.
- Luvaas, Jay (2009). "Frederick and the Art of War". Frederick the Great on the Art of War. By Friedrich II, King of Prussia. Luvaas, Jay (ed.). New York: Da Capo Press. ISBN 978-0-7867-4977-5.
- Showalter, Dennis E. (2012). Frederick the Great: A Military History. Barnsley, England: Frontline Books. ISBN 978-1-78303-479-6.
- Simms, Brendan (2009). Three Victories and a Defeat: The Rise and Fall of the First British Empire. New York: Basic Books. ISBN 978-0-465-01332-6.
