= Treaty of Hubertusburg =

1763 treaty ending the Third Silesian War

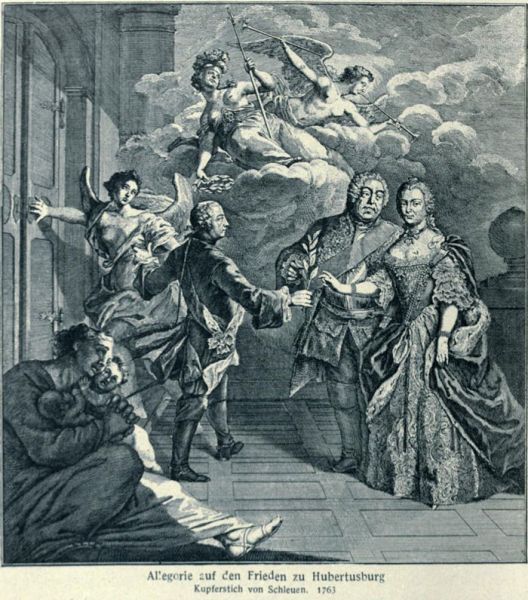
- An allegory of the Treaty of Hubertusburg
- Context: End of the Third Silesian War (part of the Seven Years' War)
- Signed: 15 February 1763
- Location: (Electorate of Saxony) Hubertusburg, Saxony
- Negotiators: (Kingdom of Prussia) Ewald Friedrich von Hertzberg; (Habsburg monarchy) Heinrich Gabriel von Collenbach; (Electorate of Saxony) Thomas von Fritsch
- Signatories: Prussia; Habsburg monarchy; Saxony
- See also: Treaty of Paris (1763).

The Treaty of Hubertusburg (German: Frieden von Hubertusburg) was signed on 15 February 1763 at Hubertusburg Castle by Prussia, Austria and Saxony to end the Third Silesian War. Together with the Treaty of Paris, signed five days earlier, it marked the end of the Seven Years' War. The treaty ended the continental conflict with no significant changes in prewar borders. Austria and Saxony renounced all claims to the Silesian territories ceded to Prussia in the 1742 Treaty of Berlin and the 1745 Treaty of Dresden. Prussia clearly stood among the ranks of the European great powers, while the treaty enhanced the rivalry with Austria.

== Background ==
Austria's resolve to repossess the rich province of Silesia, which had been lost to Prussia in 1748, was the major conflict leading to the Seven Years' War. Maria Theresa, Archduchess of Austria and Queen of Hungary and Bohemia, acquired the support of Russia, Sweden, Saxony, Spain and France, with the specific aim of waging war against Prussia and its ally, Great Britain. It was King Frederick II of Prussia, however, who initiated the hostilities with his attack and capture of Saxony in 1756.

The Seven Years' War started in 1756, with Prussia facing the allied forces of Austria, Russia, France and Sweden. Although in January 1757, the majority of the colleges of the Imperial Diet (minus Hanover, Hesse-Kassel (or Hesse-Kassel), Brunswick and Saxe-Gotha) voted against the move for war, Frederick succeeded in his quest for expanding Prussian influence, power and territory.

Through the first half of the war, the Prussians continued victorious. In the Battle of Rossbach, on 5 November 1757, the Prussian army defeated the French and also Imperial troops. The Prussians defeated the Austrians at Leuthen later in 1757 and the Russians at Zorndorf in 1758.

However, with Sweden entering the war and virtually all of Europe opposing Frederick, the tide seemed to turn. By 1759 eastern Prussia was in the hands of the Russians, and Berlin was occupied for some weeks. Austrian forces had invaded Prussia from the south. Now seriously running short of soldiers, Frederick II was in a desperate situation.

In 1758, the Anglo-Hanoverian army, an ally of Prussia commanded by Ferdinand of Brunswick, defeated the French and occupied the town of Münster. In 1759 Imperial troops invaded Saxony and expelled the Prussians.

Two significant factors, however, led to the eventual return of Prussian dominance in the war. One was the active support of the British and Hanoverians, which had been ineffective combatants but now fought successfully against the French. The second and more important was the withdrawal in 1762 of Russia and Sweden from the war. That occurred as a result of the death of Empress Elizabeth of Russia. Her successor, Peter III, an admirer of Frederick, quickly signed a peace treaty with him. By the Treaty of Saint Petersburg, Russia made peace and restored all conquests, and Sweden also made peace that year. This turn in fortune was labeled the Miracle of the House of Brandenburg.

Now fighting alone in the east, the Austrians were soundly defeated in the Battle of Burkersdorf (July 1762). The French, had suffered severe reverses as well. In America, they had lost Louisbourg (1758), Quebec (1759), and some possessions in the West Indies. In India, the British victories at Plassey (1757) and Pondichéry (1761) had destroyed France's military capabilities there. On the sea, the French took Port Mahón from the British (1757) but were defeated by Hawke in Quiberon Bay (1759). The entry of Spain into the war under the terms of the Family Compact of 1761 was of little help to France, where the war had never been popular.

== Aftermath ==
After protracted negotiations between the war-weary powers, peace was made among Prussia, Austria and Saxony at Hubertusburg and among Great Britain, France and Spain at Paris. The Treaty of Hubertusburg restored the prewar status quo but marked the ascendancy of Prussia as a leading European power. Through the Treaty of Paris, Great Britain emerged as the world's chief colonial empire, which had been its primary goal in the war, and France lost most of its overseas possessions.

The phrase "Hubertusburg Peace" is sometimes used as a description for any treaty that restores the situation existing before conflict broke out.

== See also ==
- List of treaties
