= Fontana History of European War and Society =

War and Society in Revolutionary Europe, 1770-1870 by Geoffrey Best, 1982, first volume in the series.

The Fontana History of European War and Society is a five-volume history of war and society in Europe from 1450 to 1970. It was published by Fontana in association with the University of Leicester. The series editor was Geoffrey Best, who also wrote the first volume in the series.

== Critical opinion ==
Ian Beckett described the series as a synthesis made possible by a flourishing of new, more specialised, studies, which had begun to appear after the Second World War, but took the view that Victor Kiernan's Marxist treatment of empire had not dated well. John Rigby Hale's volume, on the other hand, was described as a "model of historical writing" by Beckett, as part of a post-war movement to rescue the history of warfare from the memoirs of generals and from museum experts writing about armour and weapons.

== Volumes ==
- Geoffrey Best, War and Society in Revolutionary Europe, 1770–1870. 1982
- V. G. Kiernan, European Empires from Conquest to Collapse, 1815–1960. 1982
- Brian Bond, War and Society in Europe, 1870–1970. 1983
- J. R. Hale, War and Society in Renaissance Europe, 1450–1620. 1985 (2nd revised edition, Sutton, 1998)
- M. S. Anderson, War and Society in Europe of the Old Regime, 1618–1789. 1988
