= Treaty of Dresden =

1745 treaty ending the Second Silesian War

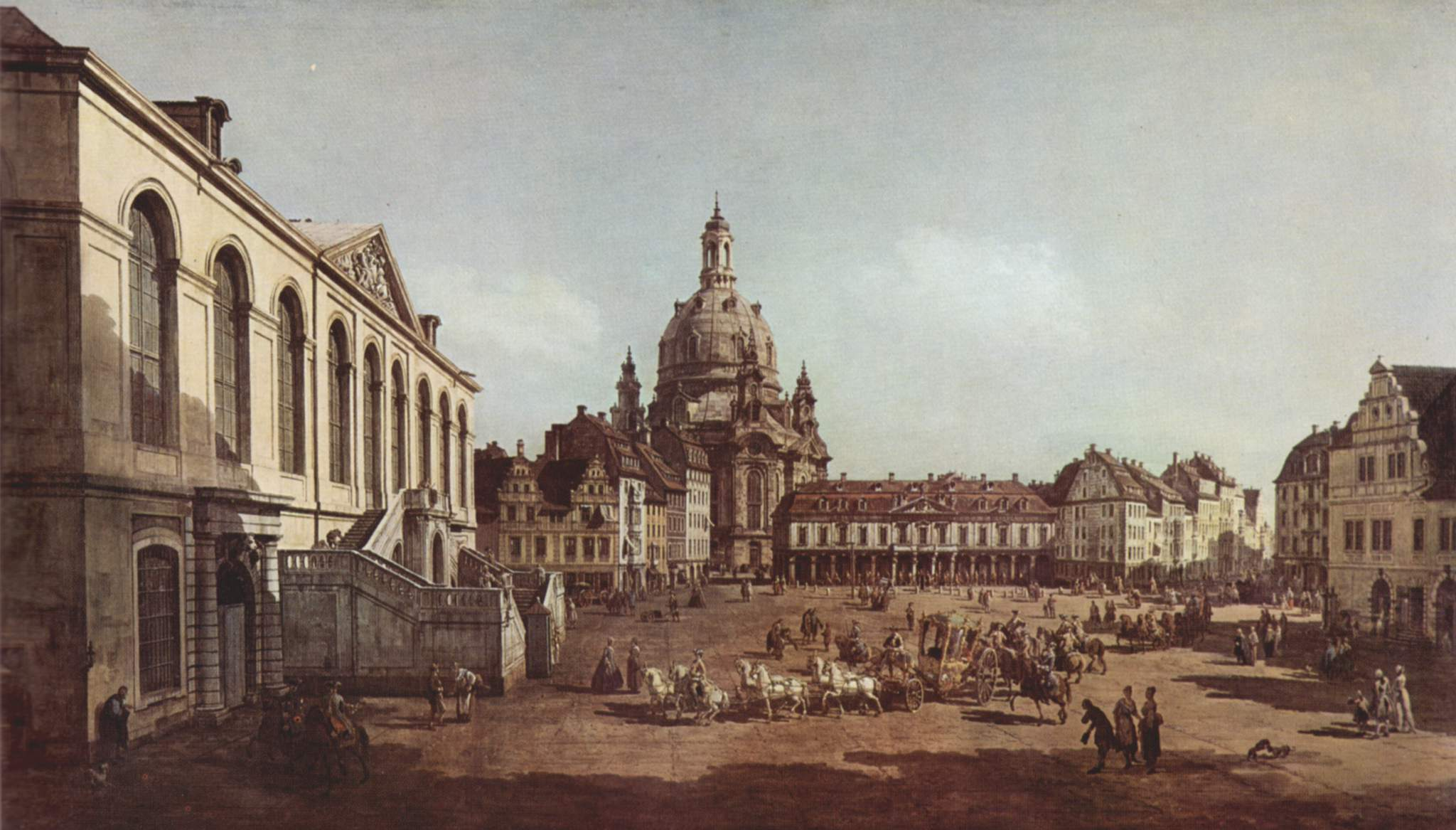
- Canaletto: Dresden, Neumarkt, oil on canvas, 1749–51
- Type: Peace treaty
- Context: Second Silesian War
- Signed: 25 December 1745
- Location: Dresden, Saxony
- Parties: Prussia; Habsburg monarchy; Saxony

The Treaty of Dresden was signed on 25 December 1745 at the Saxon capital of Dresden between Austria, Saxony and Prussia, ending the Second Silesian War.

In the 1742 Treaty of Breslau, Maria Theresa of Austria, struggling for the succession after her father Emperor Charles VI according to the Pragmatic Sanction of 1713, had to cede most of the Bohemian province of Silesia to the attacking King Frederick II of Prussia. In the following years, however, she was able to strengthen her position. She attacked the Electorate of Bavaria and in January 1745 achieved the support of Great Britain, the Dutch Republic and Saxony to reconquer Silesia. Furthermore, her rival, Emperor Charles VII, died a few days later, and on 22 April 1745 his son and successor, Elector Maximilian III Joseph of Bavaria, concluded the Treaty of Füssen with her.

By the end of May 1745, Austrian and Saxon troops invaded Prussian Silesia but were halted by Prussian forces at the Battle of Hohenfriedberg on 4 June. Maria Theresa's husband Francis I was finally elected Holy Roman Emperor on 13 September, and Frederick's troops gained shining victories at Soor and Kesselsdorf, occupying Dresden on 18 December. Frederick, however, had to cope with a rising number of enemy powers and expiring resources, all the more because he had failed to obtain support from Empress Elizabeth of Russia. Facing the situation, both sides agreed on a status quo.

Based on the terms of the agreement, Frederick acknowledged Francis as Holy Roman Emperor. In return, he maintained control over Silesia. The actually-disadvantaged side was Saxony, which had to pay Prussia one million rixdollars in reparations. Overall, the accord ratified and confirmed the tenets of both the Treaty of Breslau and the Treaty of Berlin. The accord brought the Second Silesian War to an official end.

== See also ==
- War of the Austrian Succession
- List of treaties

== Sources ==
- Encyclopædia Britannica Concise - Dresden
- The Encyclopedia of World History (2001) - December 25
