= Geoffrey Best =

English historian (1928–2018)

Geoffrey Best FBA
- Born: Geoffrey Francis Andrew Best; 20 November 1928; Osterley, Middlesex, England
- Died: 14 January 2018 (aged 89)
- Occupations: Historian and academic
- Spouse: Marigold Davies (m. 1955)
- Children: 3

Academic background
- Education: St Paul's School
- Alma mater: Trinity Hall, Cambridge

Academic work
- Discipline: History
- Sub-discipline: Military history; Political history; World War II; Winston Churchill
- Institutions: Trinity Hall, Cambridge; Corpus Christi College, Cambridge; University of Edinburgh; University of Sussex; St Antony's College, Oxford

Geoffrey Francis Andrew Best FBA (20 November 1928 – 14 January 2018) was an English historian known for his studies of warfare and works about Winston Churchill.

== Early life and family ==
Geoffrey Best was born in Osterley, Middlesex, on 20 November 1928. He was educated at St Paul's School, London. He undertook his national service in the Royal Army Educational Corps teaching illiterate Scottish soldiers to read and write.

Best married Marigold Davies in 1955 and they had three children together. Marigold later became involved in Quakerism and the Campaign for Nuclear Disarmament (CND) and she and her husband went on CND marches together.

== Career ==
Best studied at Trinity Hall, Cambridge, becoming a fellow from 1955 to 1961 and an assistant lecturer at Corpus Christi College, Cambridge, 1956 to 1961. From 1961 to 1974 he was lecturer, reader, and finally Sir Richard Lodge Professor of History at the University of Edinburgh. From 1974 to 1982 he was professor of history at the University of Sussex. He then spent six years as an academic visitor at the London School of Economics before in 1988 becoming a member of St Antony's College, University of Oxford. He was elected a fellow of the British Academy in 2003.

== Writing ==
In 1974, Best became series editor of the Fontana History of European War and Society for which he wrote War and Society in Revolutionary Europe 1770-1870 (1982).

He wrote two books on Winston Churchill, Churchill: A Study in Greatness (2001) and Churchill and War (2005).

== Death ==
Best died on 14 January 2018.

== Selected publications ==
=== Authored ===
- Shaftesbury. Batsford, London, 1964.
- Temporal Pillars. Queen Anne's Bounty, the Ecclesiastical Commissioners, and the Church of England. Cambridge University Press, Cambridge, 1964.
- Bishop Westcott and the Miners. Syndics of the Cambridge University Press, London, 1967. (Bishop Westcott memorial lecture)
- History, Politics and Universities: Inaugural Lecture Delivered on Tuesday 4th March 1969. Edinburgh University Press, Edinburgh, 1969.
- Mid-Victorian Britain, 1851-1875. Weidenfeld & Nicolson, London, 1971. ISBN 0297002767
- Humanity in Warfare: the Modern History of the International Law of Armed Conflict. Weidenfeld & Nicolson, London, 1980. ISBN 0297777378
- Honour among Men and Nations: Transformations of an Idea. University of Toronto Press, Toronto, 1981. ISBN 0802024599
- War and Society in Revolutionary Europe 1770-1870. Leicester University Press, Leicester, 1982. ISBN 071851226X
- Nuremberg and After: The Continuing History of War Crimes and Crimes Against Humanity. University of Reading, Reading, 1984. (Stenton lecture)
- War and Law since 1945. Clarendon Press, Oxford, 1994. ISBN 978-0198219910
- Churchill: A Study in Greatness. Bloomsbury, London, 2001. ISBN 9781852852535
- Churchill and War. Hambledon Continuum, 2005. ISBN 978-1852854645
- A Life of Learning: Selective Memoirs of Geoffrey Best. Matador, Kibworth Beauchamp, 2010.

=== Edited ===
- Church, R.W. The Oxford Movement: Twelve Years, 1833-1845. University of Chicago Press, Chicago, 1970. (Edited and introduced) ISBN 0226106187
- War, Economy and the Military Mind. Croom Helm, London, 1976. (With Andrew Wheatcroft)
- History, Society and the Churches: Essays in Honour of Owen Chadwick. Cambridge University Press, Cambridge, 1985. (with Derek Beales)
- The Permanent Revolution: The French Revolution and its Legacy, 1789-1989. University of Chicago Press, Chicago, 1988.
