= Treaty of Breslau =

1742 peace treaty ending the First Silesian War

Vorfrieden von Breslau (de) Vratislavský mír (cs) Pokój wrocławski (pl)
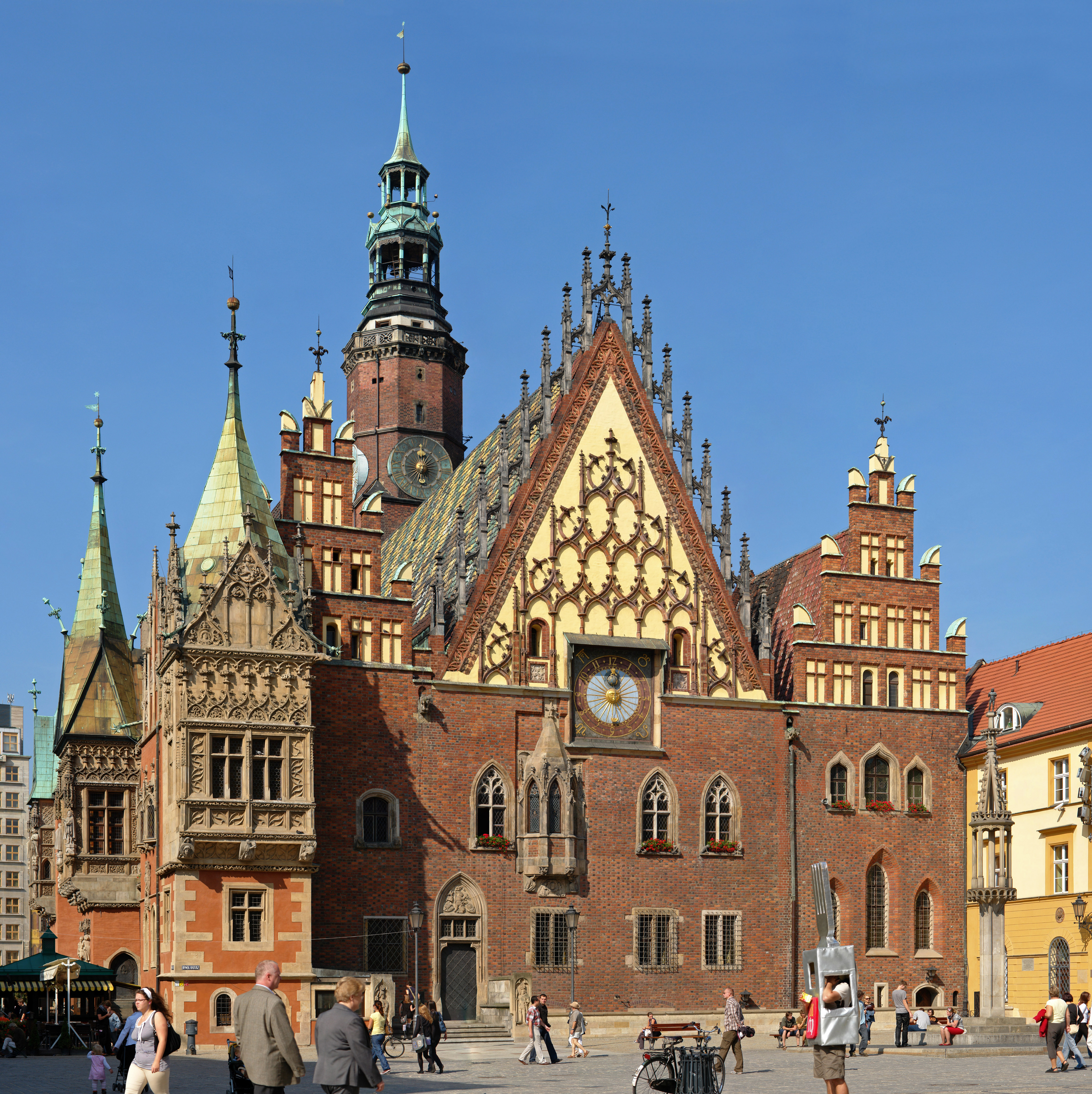
- Wrocław city hall
- Signed: 11 June 1742
- Location: Breslau, Austria
- Effective: 28 July 1742
- Condition: Treaty of Berlin
- Signatories: (Habsburg monarchy) Austria; Prussia
- Languages: French

The Treaty of Breslau was a preliminary peace agreement signed on 11 June 1742 following long negotiations at the Silesian capital Breslau (now Wrocław, Poland) by emissaries of Archduchess Maria Theresa of Austria and King Frederick II of Prussia ending the First Silesian War.

== Background ==
Frederick II had taken advantage of Maria Theresa's difficulties to prevail as Queen of Bohemia according to the Pragmatic Sanction of 1713 and in 1740 occupied Silesia, part of the Habsburg monarchy since 1526. Several attempts to expel the invaders failed, while troops of Frederick's allies France, Saxony and Bavaria even campaigned in the adjacent Bohemian lands.

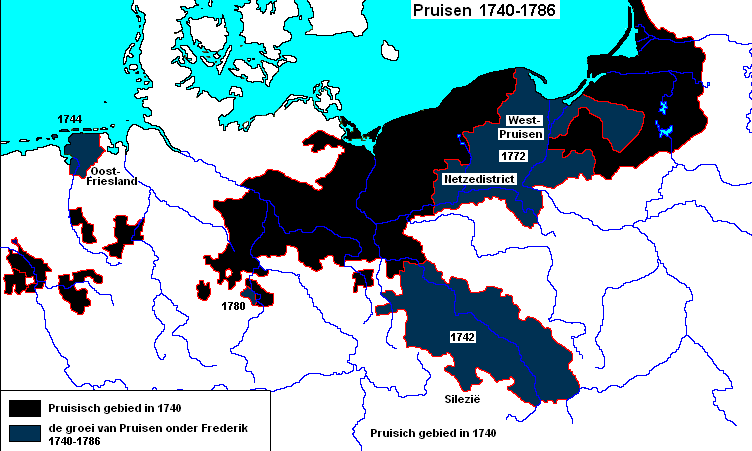
Prussian annexations under King Frederick II: Silesia in 1742, East Frisia in 1744, Royal Prussia with Netze District during the First Partition of Poland in 1772, Mansfeld in 1780

Secret peace negotiations had been carried on since fall 1741, yet still Frederick invaded Bohemia and defeated the Austrian troops at the Battle of Chotusitz on 17 May 1742. By the agency of John Carmichael, 3rd Earl of Hyndford (mocked as Hundsfott, "scoundrel" by Frederick), envoy of the British, which was eager to prevent further war in Europe, a peace was concluded.

== Content ==
Based on the terms of the treaty, Maria Theresa ceded most of the Silesian duchies to Prussia except for the Duchy of Teschen, the districts of Troppau and Krnov south of the Opava river as well as the southern part of the Duchy of Nysa, that were all to become the province of Austrian Silesia. Furthermore, Frederick annexed the Bohemian County of Kladsko.

Despite the popular name of the treaty, it was actually signed in Berlin. This treaty, along with the Treaty of Berlin signed on 28 July 1742, officially ended the First Silesian War. Except for the partition of Cieszyn Silesia and the incorporation of the Hlučín Region in 1920, and a few minor boundary adjustments, the 1742 demarcation line today still determines the border of the Czech Republic with Poland.

== See also ==
- Treaty of Trentschin
- Treaty of Namslau
- Treaty of Hubertusburg
- History of Silesia

== Bibliography ==
- Lodge, Sir Richard. Studies in Eighteenth Century Diplomacy 1740-1748. John Murray, 1930.
- Simms, Brendan. Three Victories and a Defeat: The Rise and Fall of the First British Empire. Penguin Books, 2008.
