= Matthew Smith Anderson =

English educator

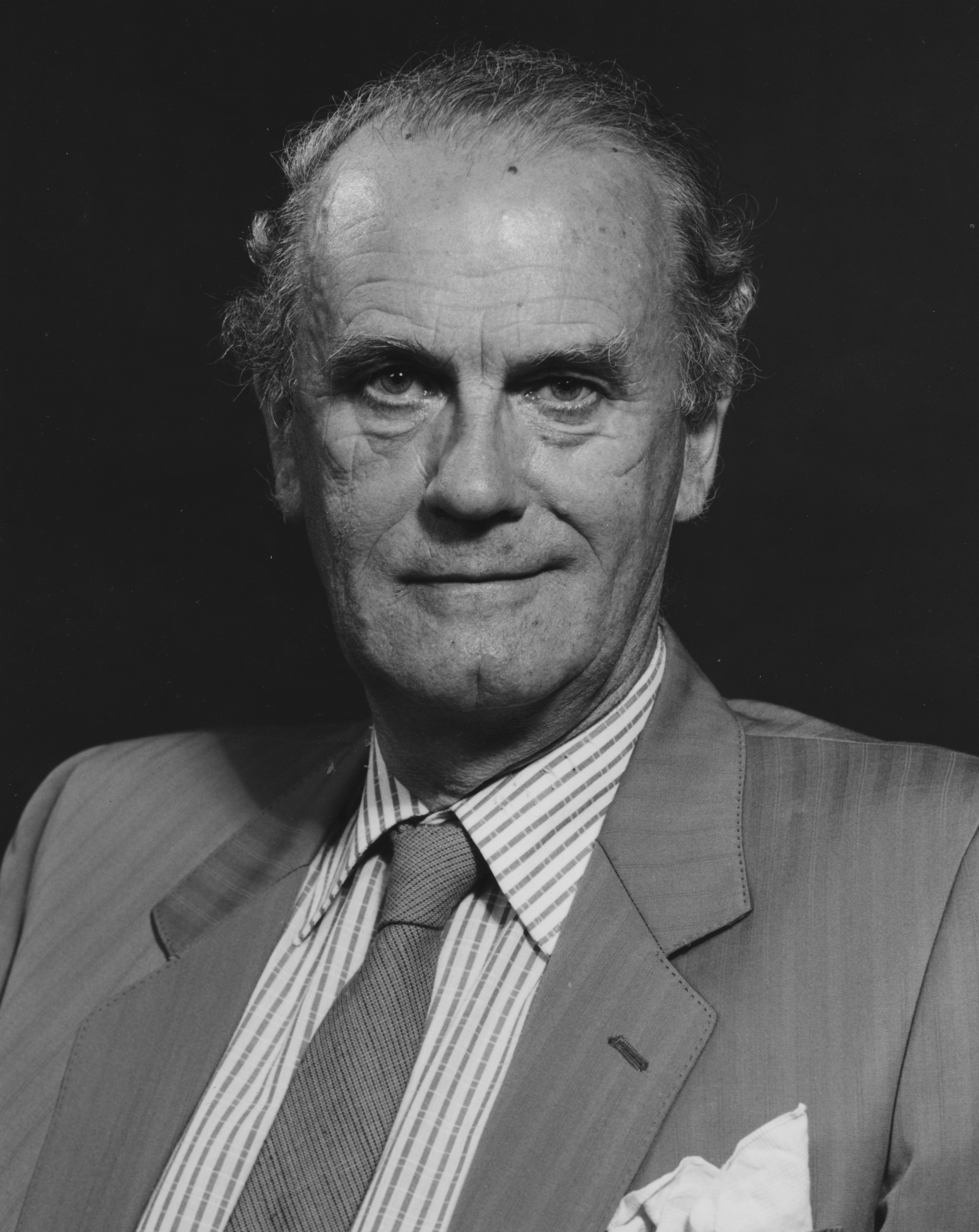
Professor Matthew Smith Anderson, 1985

Matthew Smith Anderson (1922–2006) was professor emeritus of international history at the London School of Economics.

== Selected publications ==
- Britain's Discovery of Russia 1553–1815 (1958)
- War and Society in Europe of the Old Regime, 1618–1789. (Fontana History of European War and Society)
- The Rise of Modern Diplomacy, 1450–1919
- Historians and eighteenth-century Europe, 1715–1789 (1979)
- Peter the Great (1995)
- Europe in the Eighteenth Century, 1713–1783 (1997)
- The Origins of the Modern European State System (1998)
