= Reed Browning =

American retired professor of history

- Born: 1938 (age 87–88); New York City

Academic work
- Main interests: European history, baseball history
- Notable works: The War of the Austrian Succession and other books

Reed Browning (born 1938) is an American retired professor of history.

Browning gained his B.A. from Dartmouth College, and his M.A. and Ph.D. from Yale University. He also studied at the University of Vienna. He taught at Amherst College from 1964 to 1967 and then spent forty years as an academic at Kenyon College, from which he retired in 2007.

Whilst at Kenyon College he served as provost and briefly as acting president. Recognition of his teaching excellence include the Senior Trustee Teaching Excellence Award (2001) and the Senior Cup (1981).

He has written books on British and European history, including the first and most extensive modern biography of The Duke of Newcastle (1975), Political and Constitutional Ideas of the Court Whigs (1982), and The War of the Austrian Succession (1993). A baseball fan, he has also penned two sports history books: Cy Young: A Baseball Life (2000) and Baseball’s Greatest Season: 1924 (2003).

His peer-reviewed journal articles include: "The Duke of Newcastle and the Imperial Election Plan 1749-1754", published in Journal of British Studies, Volume 7 (1967), pp. 28–47; and "New Views on the Silesian Wars", published in Journal of Military History, Volume 69, Number 2, April 2005, pp. 521–534.
