= Treaty of Berlin (1742) =

1742 treaty between Austria and Prussia

- Type: Peace treaty
- Context: First Silesian War
- Signed: 28 July 1742
- Location: Berlin, Prussia
- Parties: Prussia; (Habsburg monarchy) Austria

The Treaty of Berlin was a treaty between the Habsburg archduchess Maria Theresa of Austria, who was also Queen of Bohemia, and the Prussian king Frederick the Great, signed on 28 July 1742 in Berlin. It was the formal peace treaty that confirmed the preliminary agreement achieved with English mediation by the 11 June Treaty of Breslau, and officially ended the First Silesian War.

Based on article 5 of the treaty,

to avoid further border disputes, Her Majesty the Queen of Hungary and Bohemia by the present treaty for all eternity and with all sovereignty and independence cedes from the Lands of the Bohemian Crown both Lower and Upper Silesia to His Majesty the King of Prussia, notabene except for the Principality of Teschen and the City of Troppau (...)

Austrian Silesia comprising the ducal lands of Neisse (yellow), Troppau (red) with Jägerndorf (blue), and Teschen (orange)

Maria Theresa ceded most of Silesia with the County of Kladsko to Frederick, except for those districts of the Duchy of Troppau that were located south of the Opava river, including the southern part of the former Duchy of Jägerndorf, the possession of which had been one pretext for Frederick's invasion. The Duchy of Neisse held by the Breslau bishops was also partitioned, with the fortress-city of Nysa and the larger northern portion of the territory falling to Prussia. Austria retained the entire Upper Silesian Duchy of Teschen, ruled by Maria Theresa's husband, Francis Stephen of Lorraine, Grand Duke of Tuscany. The remaining Habsburg territories were incorporated into the crown land of Austrian Silesia.

Prussia in turn left the anti-Habsburg coalition it had forged with France, Spain, Sweden, Naples and the Electorates of Bavaria, Saxony and Cologne. It also assumed debts of about 1.7 million florins which Austria had contracted with her ally Great Britain. King George II of Great Britain acted as guarantor.

With his territorial gain, Frederick enlarged the Prussian territory by one third, achieving the status of a European great power and initiating the hundred-year Austria–Prussia rivalry. However, Prussia's former ally King Louis XV of France was upset by this peace agreement that gave the united Austrian, British and Hanoverian forces a free hand to oust the French troops at the 1743 Battle of Dettingen - an alienation that ultimately led to the Diplomatic Revolution of 1756. Maria Theresa's Wittelsbach rival Emperor Charles VII, deserted and humiliated, had to stay at his Frankfurt exile while his Bavarian electorate remained under Austrian occupation.

The peace reached was short-lived, as both sides prepared for the Second Silesian War, opened by Frederick marching against Prague in August 1744.

== See also ==
- Silesia Province
- Treaty of Namslau
- Treaty of Trentschin
