= List of displayed Mikoyan-Gurevich MiG-23s =

This is a list of displayed Mikoyan-Gurevich MiG-23s.

== Aircraft on display ==
=== Belgium ===
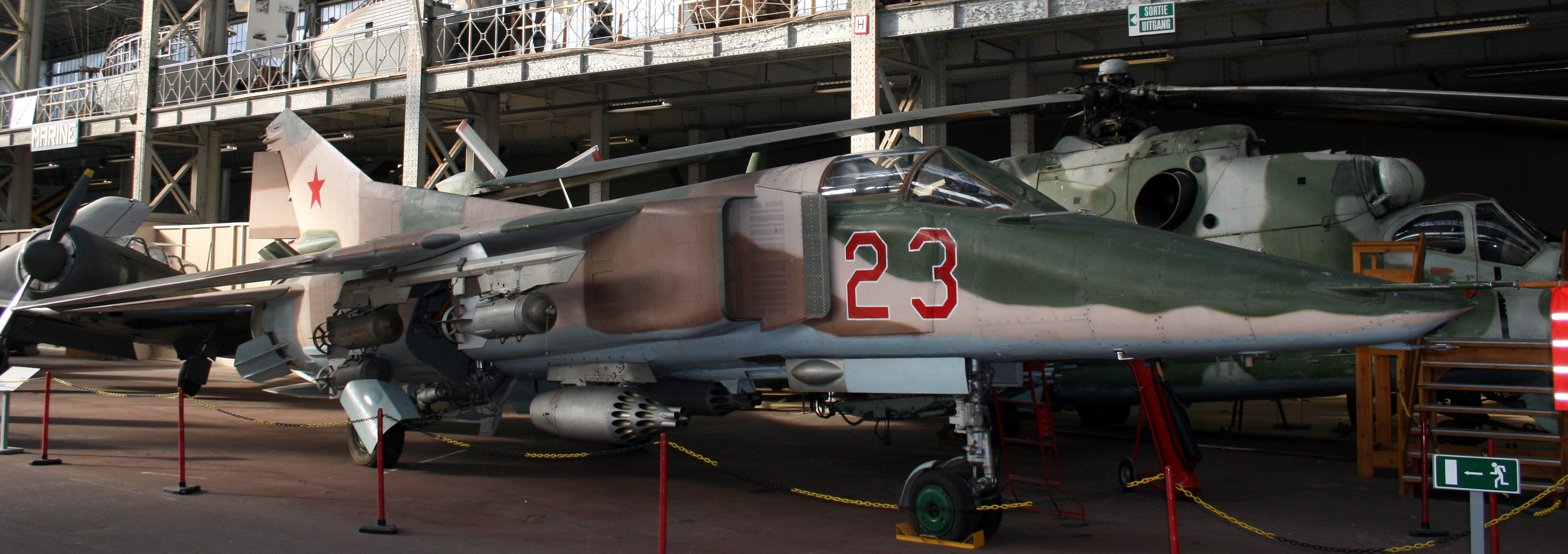
MiG-23BN on display at the Royal Museum of the Armed Forces and Military History

- 4421 (Egyptian Air Force) painted as 23 Red (Soviet Air Force) – MiG-23BN on static display at the Royal Museum of the Armed Forces and Military History in Brussels.
- 20+59 (German Air Force) – MiG-23UB on static display at the Belgian Military Radio and Communications Museum in Bessemer, Limburg.

=== Bulgaria ===
- 867 – MiG-23MLA on static display at the National Museum of Military History in Sofia.
- 870 – MiG-23MLA on static display at the National Museum of Military History in Sofia.
- 26 – MiG-23UB on static display at the National Museum of Military History in Sofia.
- 29 – MiG-23UB on static display at the National Museum of Military History in Sofia.
- 021 – MiG-23UB on static display at the Museum of Aviation in Krumovo, Plovdiv county.
- 06 – MiG-23BN on static display at Trakia Industrial zone, Plovdiv.
- 66 – MiG-23BN on static display near Cheshnegirovo Air Base, Plovdiv county.
- 50 – MiG-23BN on static display at the Museum of Aviation in Krumovo, Plovdiv county.
- 79 – MiG-23BN on static display at the Museum of Aviation in Krumovo, Plovdiv county.
- 63 – MiG-23BN on static display at Graf Ignatievo Air Base in Graf Ignatievo, Plovdiv county.
- 670 – MiG-23MF on static display at the Museum of Aviation in Krumovo, Plovdiv county.
- 390 – MiG-23MLD on static display at the Museum of Aviation in Krumovo, Plovdiv county.

=== Canada ===
- 4857 (Czech Air Force) – MiG-23ML on display at Air Defence Museum of Canadian Forces Base Bagotville in La Baie, Quebec. This airframe was donated to the museum by the Czech Republic.

=== China ===
- 9501 – (Egyptian Air Force) MiG-23MS on static display at the Chinese Aviation Museum in Beijing, Beijing.

=== Czech Republic ===
- 3646 – MiG-23MF on static display at the Prague Aviation Museum in Prague.
- 4850 – MiG-23ML on static display at Caslav Chotusice Airport in Chotusice, Central Bohemia.
- 9825 – MiG-23BN on static display at the Prague Aviation Museum in Prague.
- 5733 – MiG-23BN on static display at Caslav Chotusice Airport in Chotusice, Central Bohemia.
- 7905 – MiG-23UB on static display at the Prague Aviation Museum in Prague.

=== Denmark ===
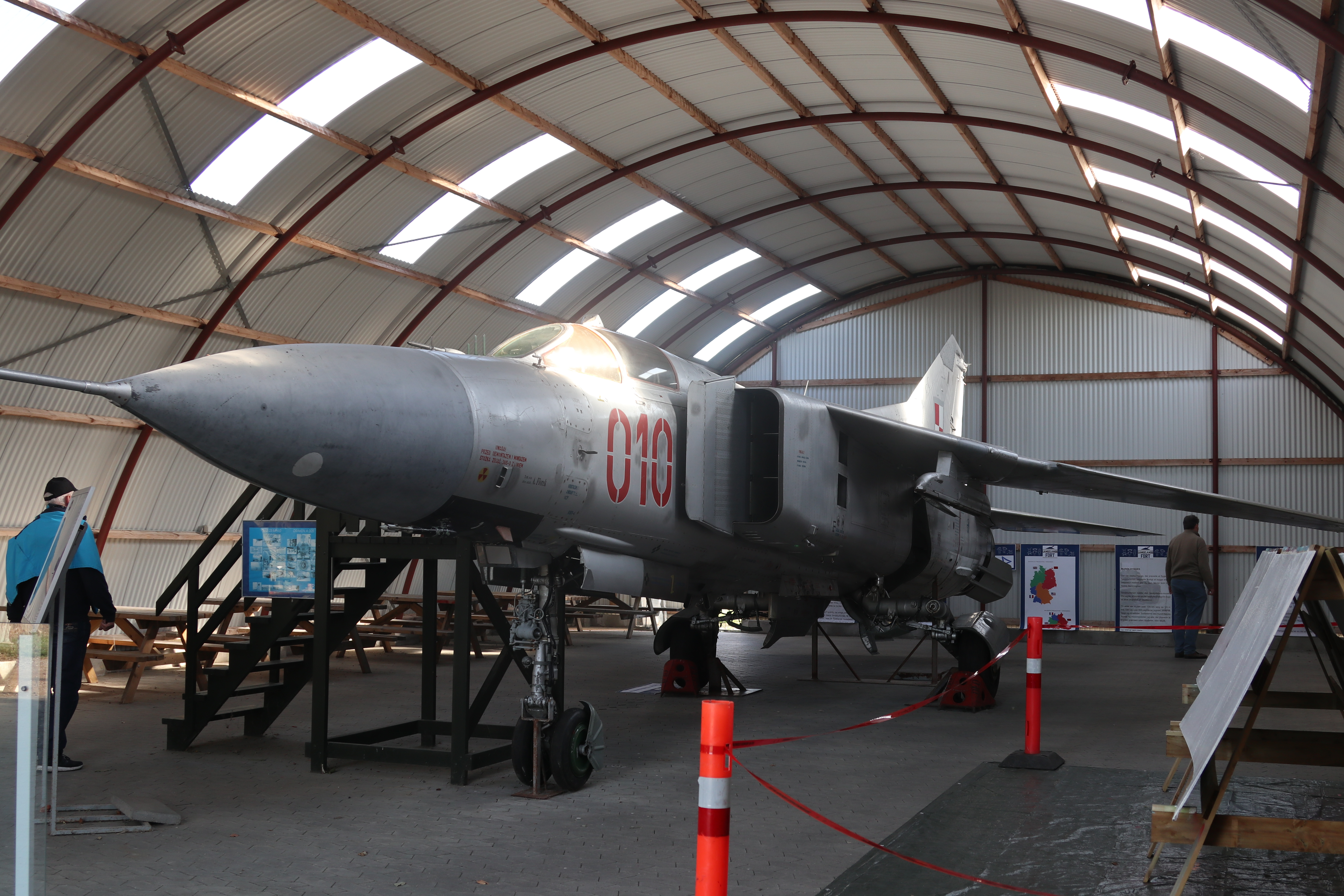
MiG-23MF on display at the Cold War Museum Langelandsfort

- 010 (Polish Air Force) – MiG-23MF on static display at the Cold War Museum Langelandsfort in Bagenkop, Langeland.

=== Estonia ===
- 32 Blue (Ukrainian Air Force) – MiG-23MLD on static display at the Estonian Aviation Museum in Lange, Tartu.

=== France ===
- 3887 (Czech Air Force) – MiG-23MF on static display at the Musee des Avions de Chasse in Savigny-lès-Beaune, Burgundy.
- 20+30 (German Air Force) – MiG-23ML on static display at the Musée de l’air et de l’espace in Le Bourget, Île-de-France.

=== Germany ===
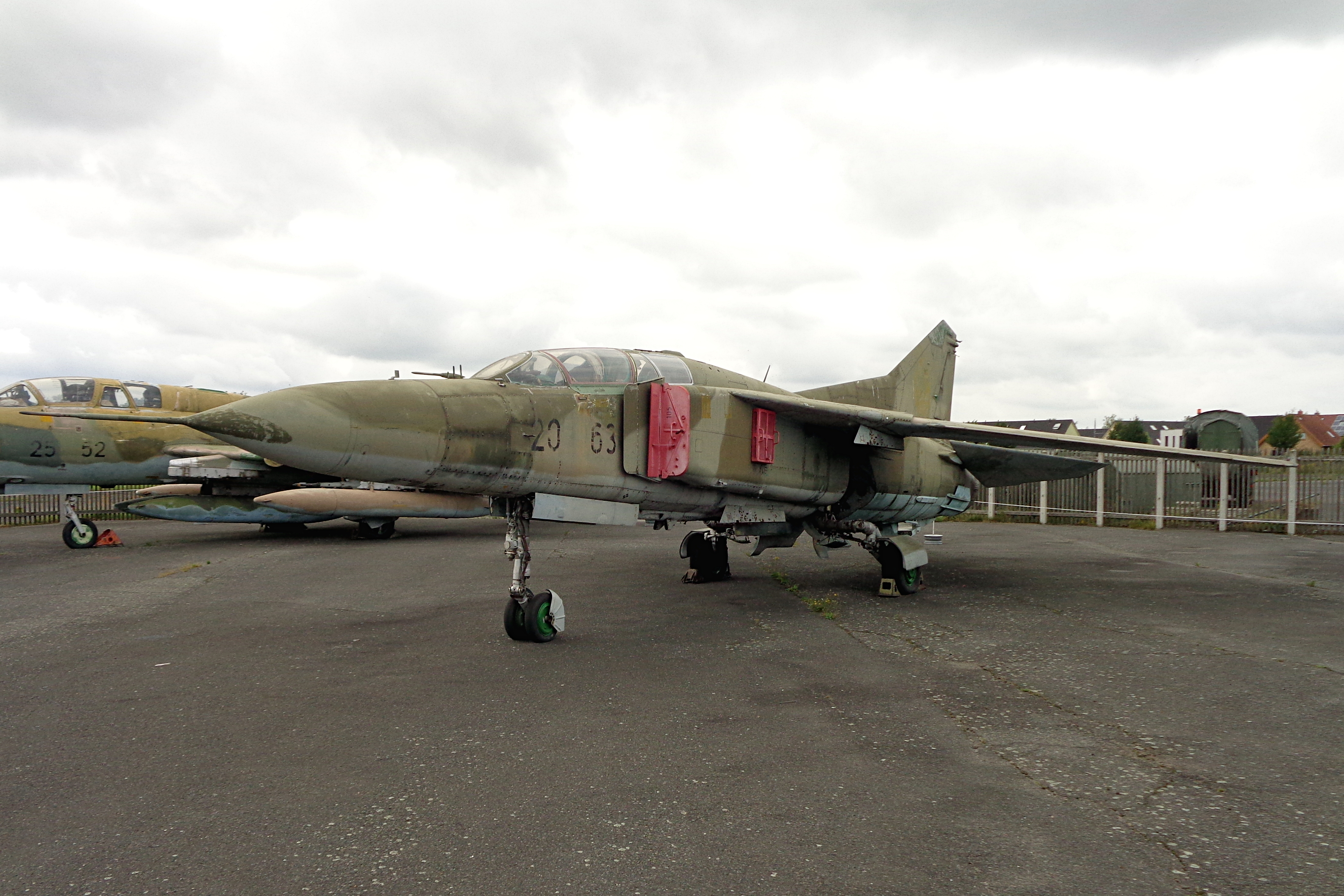
MiG-23UB on display at the Luftwaffenmuseum der Bundeswehr

- 08 Red (Soviet Air Force) – MiG-23S on static display at the Luftfahrtmuseum Finowfurt in Eberswalde, Brandenburg.
- 20+01 – MiG-23MF on static display at the Flugausstellung Hermeskeil in Hermeskeil, Rhineland-Palatinate.
- 20+04 – MiG-23MF on static display at the Flugplatzmuseum Cottbus in Cottbus, Brandenburg.
- 20+05 – MiG-23MF on static display at the Technikmuseum Hugo Junkers in Dessau-Roßlau, Saxony-Anhalt.
- 20+02 – MiG-23MF on static display at the Luftwaffenmuseum der Bundeswehr in Berlin.
- 20+10 – MiG-23ML on static display at the Interessenverein Luftfahrt Neuenkirchen in Neuenkirchen, Mecklenburg-Vorpommern.
- 20+19 – MiG-23ML on static display at the Flugausstellung Hermeskeil in Hermeskeil, Rhineland-Palatinate.
- 20+11 – MiG-23ML on static display at Rostock–Laage Airport in Rostock, Mecklenburg-Vorpommern.
- 20+13 – MiG-23ML on static display at the Luftwaffenmuseum der Bundeswehr in Berlin.
- 332 (East German Air Force) – MiG-23ML on static display at the Luftfahrttechnischen Museum in Rechlin, Mecklenburg-Vorpommern. This airframe was previously on display at the Historical Technical Museum, Peenemünde.
- 20+39 – MiG-23BN on static display at the Technik Museum Speyer in Speyer, Rhineland-Palatinate.
- 20+46 – MiG-23BN on static display at the Flugausstellung Hermeskeil in Hermeskeil, Rhineland-Palatinate.
- 20+47 – MiG-23BN on static display at the Deutsches Museum Flugwerft Schleissheim in Munich, Bavaria.
- 20+51 – MiG-23BN on static display at the Luftwaffenmuseum der Bundeswehr in Berlin.
- 20+55 – MiG-23BN on static display at the Luftfahrtmuseum Finowfurt in Eberswalde, Brandenburg.
- 20+49 – MiG-23BN on static display at the Technik Museum Speyer in Speyer, Rhineland-Palatinate.
- 20+62 – MiG-23UB on static display at the Flugplatzmuseum Cottbus in Cottbus, Brandenburg.
- 20+63 – MiG-23UB on static display at the Luftwaffenmuseum der Bundeswehr in Berlin.
- 20+57 – MiG-23UB on static display at the Luftfahrtmuseum Finowfurt in Eberswalde, Brandenburg.

=== Hungary ===
- 20 – MiG-23UB on static display at the Military Museum and Technology Park in Kecel, Bacs-Kiskun.
- 06 – MiG-23MF on static display at the Airplane Museum of Szolnok in Szolnok, Jász-Nagykun-Szolnok.
- 15 – MiG-23UB on static display at the Airplane Museum of Szolnok in Szolnok, Jász-Nagykun-Szolnok.

=== India ===
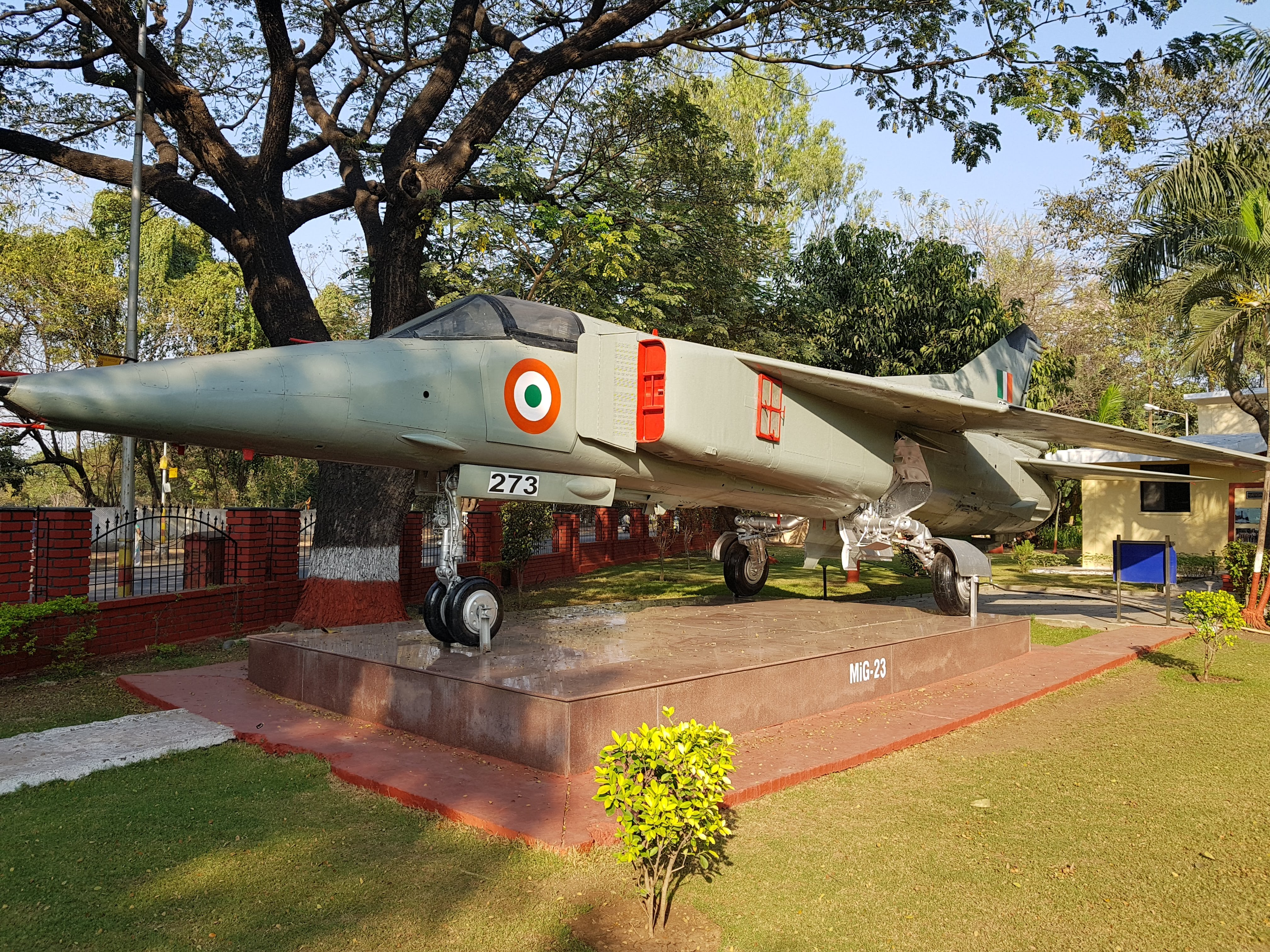
MiG-23BN on display at the National War Memorial

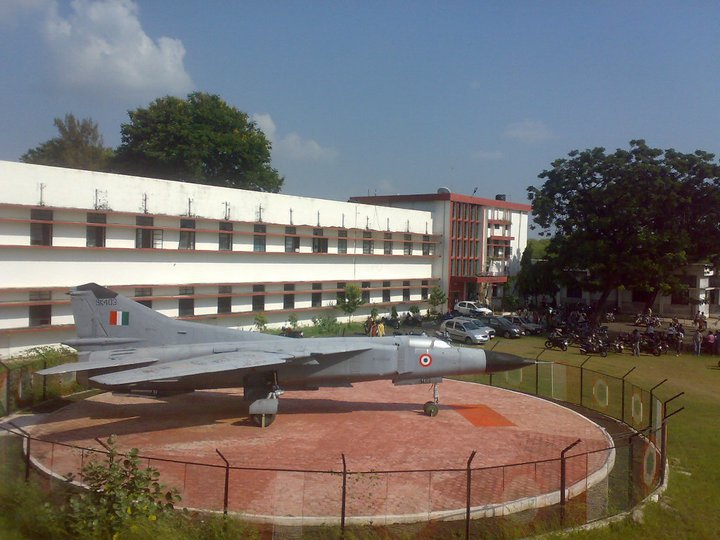
MiG-23 on display at Ujjain Engineering College

- Mig-23BN-SK-247 on display at Amrita University, Coimbatore, Tamil Nadu in the Department of Aerospace Engineering's Lab.
- MiG-23 on display at Hindustan University in Chennai, Tamil Nadu.
- MiG-23 on display at Air Force Quarters in Mumbai, Maharashtra.
- MiG-23BN on static display at Visvesvaraya National Institute of Technology in Nagpur, Maharashtra.
- MiG-23BN on static display at the University of Petroleum & Energy Studies in Dehradun, Uttarakhand. This airframe was donated by the Indian Air Force and came from Halwara Airbase.
- SM217 - MiG-23BN on static display at Aligarh Muslim University in Aligarh, Uttar Pradesh.
- SM202 - MiG-23BN on static display at the National Institute of Technology, Tiruchirappalli in Tiruchirappalli, Tamil Nadu.
- MiG-23BN on static display at the National War Memorial Southern Command in Pune Cantonment, Maharashtra.
- SM268 - MiG-23BN on static display at Guru Nanak Dev University in Amritsar, Punjab.
- SM219 - MiG-23BN on static display at Sainik School, Kapurthala in Kapurthala, Punjab.
- MiG-23BN on static display at Pushpa Gujral Science City near Kapurthala, Punjab.
- MiG-23BN on static display at Halwara Air Force Station in Halwara, Punjab.
- SM262 - MiG-23BN on static display at Maintenance Command Headquarters in Nagar, Maharashtra.
- MiG-23UM on static display at an army cantonment in Jorhat, Assam.
- MiG-23MF on static display at Sainik School, Satara in Satara, Maharashtra.
- MiG-23 on static display near Military area in Kolhapur, Maharashtra.
- SK419 - MiG-23MF on static display at 11 Base Repair Depot in Ozar, Maharashtra.
- SK401 - MiG-23MF on static display at Army Institute of Physical Training in Pune, Maharashtra.
- SK423 - MiG-23MF on static display at Kamalnayan Bajaj Park in Pune, Maharashtra.
- MiG-23 on static display at Pimpri Chinchwad Science Park in Pune, Maharashtra.
- SK403 – MiG-23 on static display at Ujjain Engineering College in Ujjain, Madhya Pradesh.
- MiG-23 on static display at Government College in Nattakom, Kerala.

=== Israel ===
- 2786 (Syrian Air Force) – MiG-23ML on static display at the Israeli Air Force Museum in Hatzerim, South District.

=== Kyrgyzstan ===
- MiG-23 on static display at Route A365/Lenin Street, near Tokmok, Kyrgyzstan.

=== Lithuania ===
- 05 Yellow (Ukrainian Air Force) - MiG-23MLD on static display at Istros Aviapark in Stanioniai, Panevėžys.

=== Poland ===
- 120 – MiG-23MF on static display at the Polish Aviation Museum in Kraków.

=== Russia ===
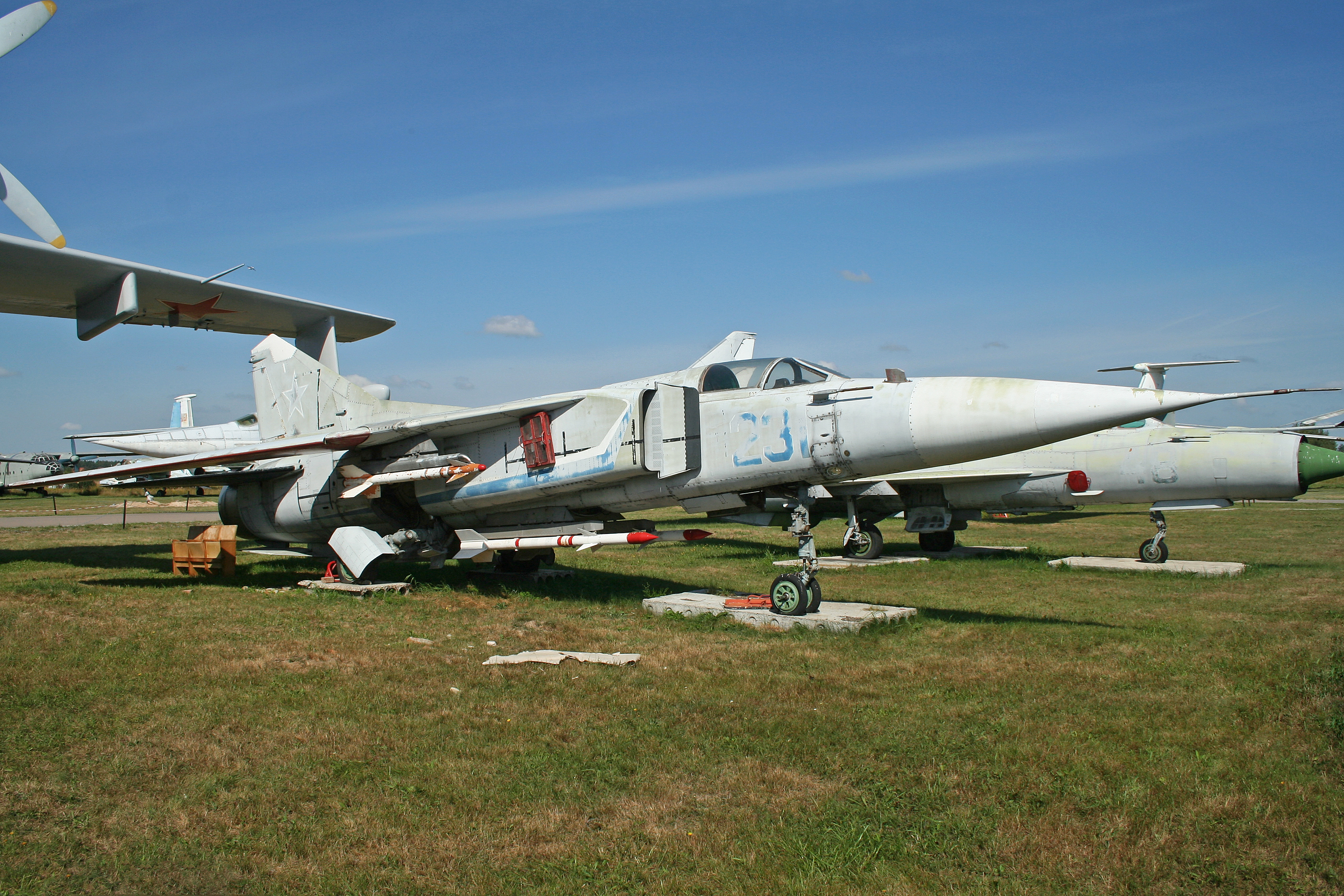
MiG-23 on display at the Central Air Force Museum

- MiG-23S on static display at the Central Armed Forces Museum in Moscow.
- 0390206625 – MiG-23ML in storage in unrestored condition at the Central Air Force Museum in Monino, Moscow.
- 0390325365 – MiG-23ML in storage in unrestored condition at the Central Air Force Museum in Monino, Moscow.
- MiG-23 on static display at the Central Air Force Museum in Monino, Moscow.
- MiG-23 on static display at the Central Air Force Museum in Monino, Moscow.

=== Serbia ===
- MiG-23 on static display at the Belgrade Aviation Museum in Surčin, Belgrade.

=== Spain ===
- 20+12 (German Air Force) – MiG-23ML on static display at the Museo del Aire in Madrid.

=== Ukraine ===
- 54 Red – MiG-23ML on static display at the Ukraine State Aviation Museum in Kyiv.
- 84 White – MiG-23UB on static display at the Ukraine State Aviation Museum in Kyiv.

=== United Kingdom ===
- 04 Red (Soviet Air Force) painted as 458 of Polish Air Force – MiG-23M on static display at the Newark Air Museum in Winthorpe, Nottinghamshire.

=== United States ===
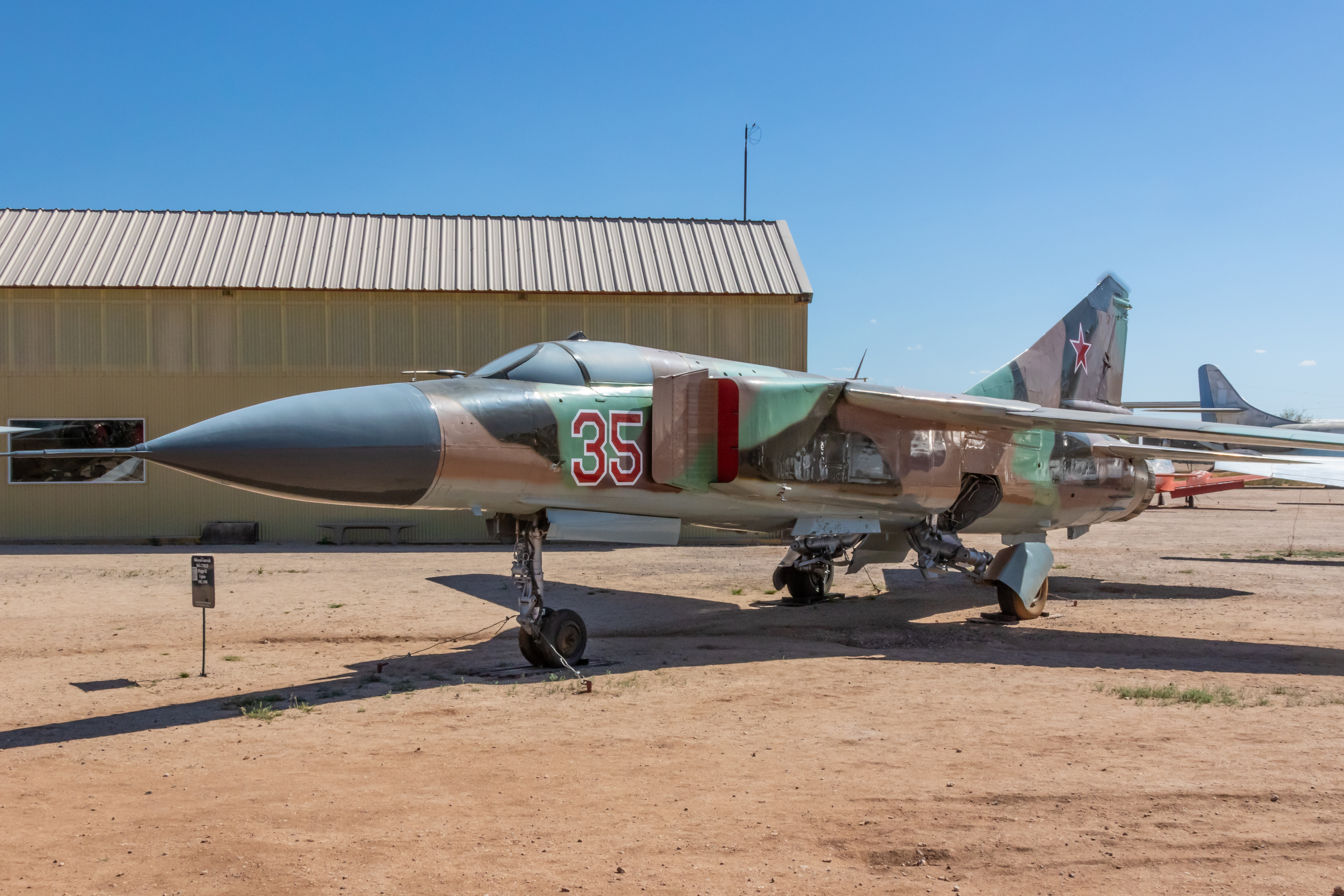
MiG-23MLD on display at the Pima Air & Space Museum

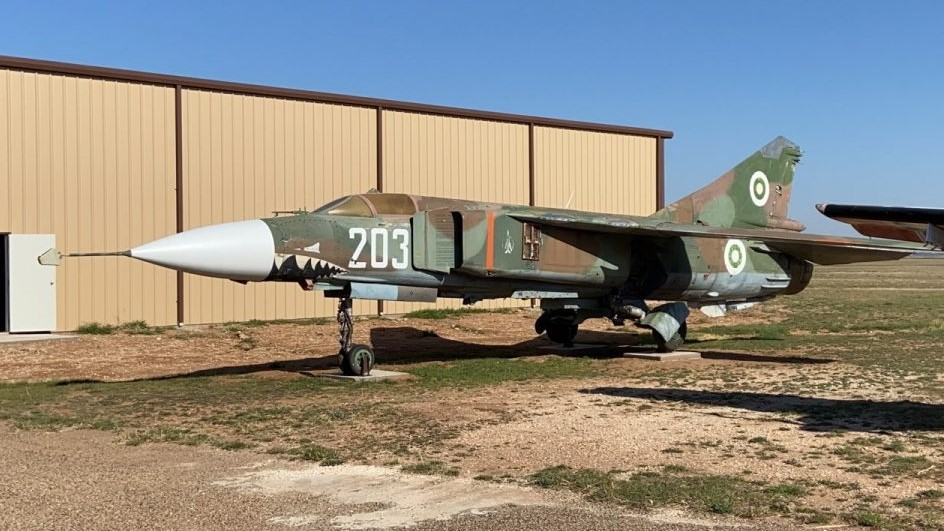
Bulgarian Air Force MiG-23 on display at the Texas Air Museum

- 44 White (Soviet Air Force) – MiG-23MLD on static display at the Pima Air and Space Museum in Tucson, Arizona.
- 20+25 (German Air Force) – MiG-23ML on static display at the Threat Training Facility at Nellis Air Force Base in North Las Vegas, Nevada.
- MiG-23BN on static display at the Threat Training Facility at Nellis Air Force Base in North Las Vegas, Nevada.
- 20+15 (German Air Force) – MiG-23ML on static display at Strategic Air Command & Aerospace Museum in Ashland, Nebraska.
- 20+20 (German Air Force) – MiG-23ML on static display at Goodfellow Air Force Base in San Angelo, Texas.
- 20+16 (German Air Force) – MiG-23ML on static display at the Evergreen Aviation & Space Museum in McMinnville, Oregon.
- 20+23 (German Air Force) – MiG-23ML on static display at Naval Air Station Fallon in Fallon, Nevada.
- 5744 (Czech Air Force) – MiG-23BN on static display at March Field Air Museum in Riverside, California. This airframe was formerly operated by the Czechoslovak Air Force.
- MiG-23MS on static display at the National Museum of the United States Air Force in Dayton, Ohio.
- 203 (Bulgarian Air Force) - MiG-23MLD on static display at the Texas Air Museum, Slaton, Texas.
- 211 (Bulgarian Air Force) - MiG-23MLD stored at Grissom Air Museum, Peru, Indiana.
- 217 (Bulgarian Air Force) - MiG-23MLD on static display at Wings Over the Rockies Air and Space Museum in Denver, Colorado.
