= Battle of Chotusitz =

Battle during the War of the Austrian Succession

- Part of First Silesian War and War of the Austrian Succession
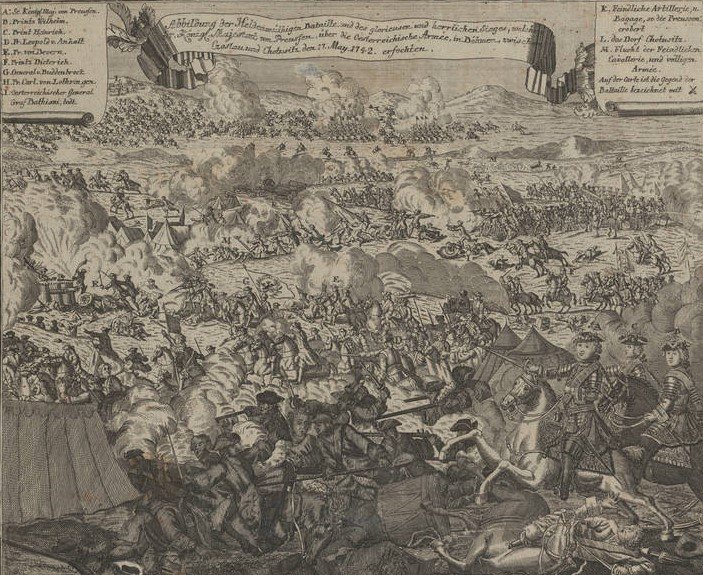
- "Battle of Chotusitz and Czaslau" (engraving by G. P. Busch)
Date	17 May 1742
Location	Chotusice, Bohemia 49°56′57″N 15°23′40″E
Result	Prussian victory

Belligerents
(Habsburg monarchy) Austria	Prussia

Commanders and leaders
Charles of Lorraine; Karl Josef Batthyány; Von Daun; Liechtenstein	Frederick the Great; Leopold of Anhalt-Dessau von Buddenbrock von Waldow

Strength
25,000 to 30,000	25,000 to 28,000

Casualties and losses
5,100 to 7,000 dead or wounded or missing; 1,200 prisoners	4,900 to 7,000 dead, wounded or missing

The Battle of Chotusitz (Note: Also known as Chotusice or Battle of Čáslav), took place on 17 May 1742, in Bohemia, now the Czech Republic, during the First Silesian War, part of the wider War of the Austrian Succession. Led by Charles of Lorraine, an Imperial force of around 25,000 men was advancing against French-occupied Prague, when it ran into a Prussian army of roughly equal size, commanded by Frederick the Great. Casualties were heavy on both sides, and the battle had little impact on the war in general, but is generally considered a Prussian victory.

The war ended with the Treaty of Breslau in June 1742, allowing Austria to recapture Prague in December. Hostilities resumed in 1744 with the outbreak of the Second Silesian War.

== Background ==
The War of the Austrian Succession was sparked by the death of Charles VI in 1740 and the succession of his daughter Maria Theresa. Salic law previously excluded women from inheriting the Habsburg monarchy; (Note: Often referred to as 'Austria', it included Austria, Hungary, Croatia, Bohemia, the Austrian Netherlands, and Parma) the 1713 Pragmatic Sanction set this aside, allowing Maria Theresa to succeed her father.

However, Austrian dominance of the Holy Roman Empire was increasingly threatened by the rise of Bavaria, Prussia and Saxony respectively. For their own purposes, each of these opposed the Sanction, and with French support invaded Crown of Bohemia, then the most important industrial area in Europe, comprising Silesia, Moravia and Bohemia. In December 1740, Frederick II initiated the First Silesian War by occupying Silesia. The single richest province in the Empire, generating 10% of total Imperial income, its loss was a serious blow to Austria.

Victory at Mollwitz in April 1741 consolidated Frederick's hold on Silesia. After a French-Bavarian force captured Prague in November, Charles of Bavaria was crowned King of Bohemia, and on 12 February 1742 became the first non-Habsburg Emperor since 1437. However, in a rare example of an Austrian winter offensive, by the end of February 1742, von Khevenhüller occupied much of Bavaria, including Munich, and most of Bohemia.

Key locations in text

The Austrians also used irregular troops known as "Pandurs" to attack Prussian lines of communication, inflicting considerable damage on both troops and morale, one officer writing 'these thieves and robbers...never show themselves in battle, like proper brave soldiers.' In response, Frederick moved into Moravia in March, and established himself at Židlochovice, which allowed him to threaten Vienna.

By stripping garrisons from the rest of Bohemia, Maria Theresa assembled a field army of 28,000 to retake Prague. Charles of Lorraine was given command, despite his reputation as a cautious, timid and defensively minded general. Frederick advanced into North-East Bohemia, and by 16 May had 10,000 infantry at Kutná Hora, with 18,000 men under Leopold of Anhalt-Dessau a day's march behind. During the afternoon of 16 May, Leopold's rearguard began skirmishing with Imperial cavalry, and the latter accelerated his march to close the gap with Frederick. At 2:00 am on 17 May, his exhausted troops stopped at the small village of Chotusice, three hours march from Kutná Hora.

== Battle ==
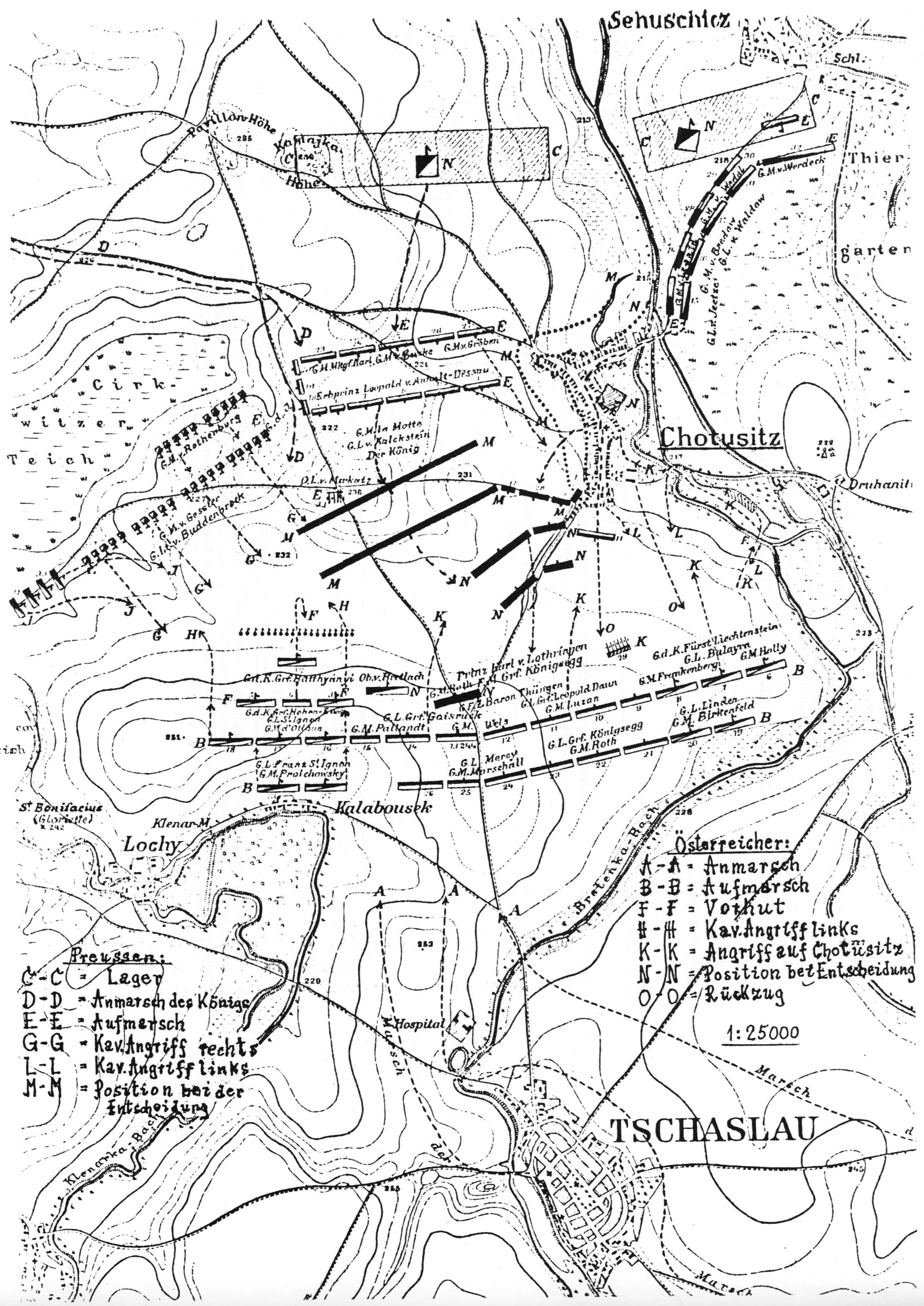
Battle plan, Chotusitz

Instructed to hold until Frederick reached him, Leopold deployed south of Chotusice, his infantry facing south-east, with cavalry on either flank. The left was commanded by Waldow, the right by the 70 year old veteran von Buddenbrock, Leopold leaving room for Frederick's infantry to deploy when they arrived. Charles of Lorraine hoped to attack before Frederick could reach him but was not ready to do so until 7:00 am; as he advanced north from Čáslav, his army drifted slightly to the right, allowing Buddenbrock's cavalry to outflank them.

Frederick arrived on the field at 8:00 am; to provide time to organise the infantry, he ordered the Prussian cavalry to charge, supported by field artillery. They drove the Austrian cavalry back, but the day was hot and dry, raising a huge cloud of dust and effectively blinding them. In the confusion, some units attacked in the wrong direction, allowing Karl Josef Batthyány and Liechtenstein to rally their men. Both sets of cavalry began looting each other's baggage trains, an act of collective indiscipline that rendered them useless for much of the battle.

The Austrian artillery had been bombarding Chotusice, around 9:00 am, Daun's infantry stormed the town, slowly driving Leopold's forces from house to house. As they did so, they set it on fire, the smoke adding to the confusion caused by the dust, and making exercising command almost impossible. By 10:30, Frederick's fresh infantry were deployed in a great square of 24 battalions; wheeling left, they fired into the Austrian infantry outside Chotusice. His flanks exposed by the cavalry's disappearance, Charles decided to settle for a draw. He ordered a general retreat through Čáslav, leaving some of his heavy guns behind; Liechtenstein's cavalry held off the Prussians, and by noon, combat had ceased.

== Aftermath ==
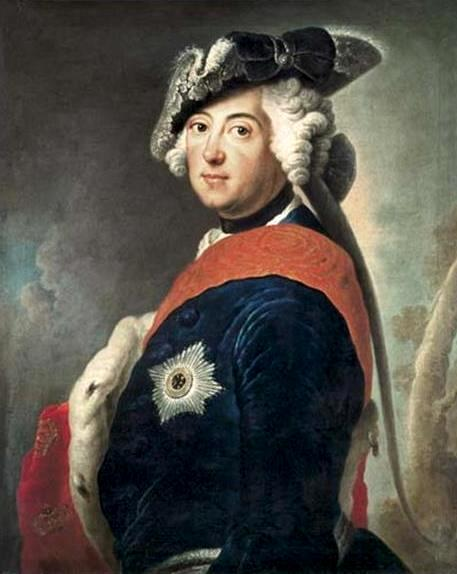
Frederick II of Prussia

The battle left the basic strategic situation unchanged; Charles was still able to move against Prague, while the Prussian presence in Moravia remained a threat to Vienna. Habsburg policy was generally to avoid fighting on too many fronts at the same time; although Prussia was the most dangerous, but also the most difficult to defeat. Although recovering Silesia remained a Habsburg priority for decades, Maria Theresa was willing to agree a temporary truce with Prussia to improve her position elsewhere.

This suited Frederick, who was short of money and men and also suspected France was preparing a separate peace. In June, the Treaty of Breslau ended the First Silesian War; Prussian troops withdrew from Bohemia, and Austria recaptured Prague in December.

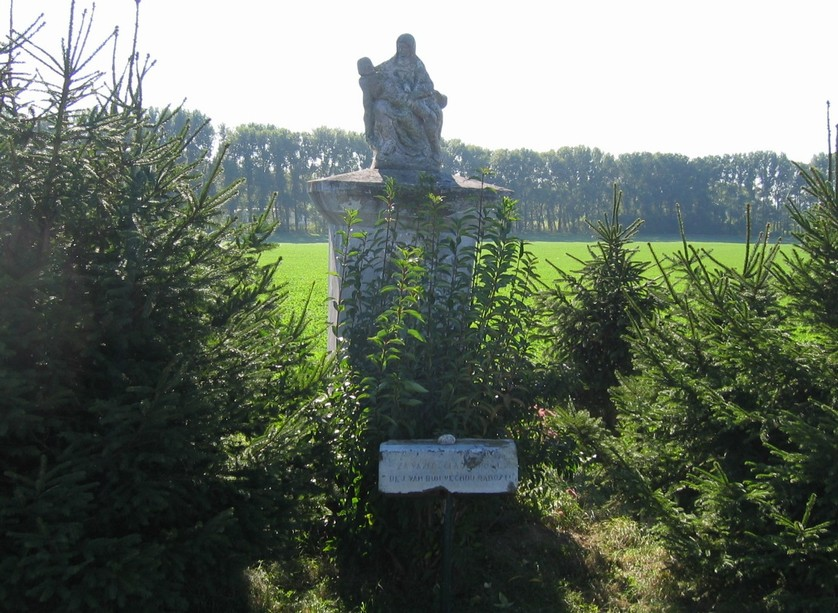
Battlefield memorial at Chotusice

Like other contemporaries, such as Maurice de Saxe, Frederick concluded morale was more effective in destroying enemy formations than firepower. At Mollwitz, the Austrians fled when faced with the steady, disciplined advance of the Prussian infantry; at Chotusice, it convinced Charles of Lorraine to settle for a draw. When the Second Silesian War began in 1744, Frederick told his officers the infantry had to do only two things; form up quickly, then maintain their formation.

The battle also showed the Prussian cavalry still needed work, particularly in horsemanship; a contributory factor to their apparent indiscipline was the inability of many to control their mounts and this became an area of focus after 1743. Von Gessler, who led Buddenbrock's charge, was promoted lieutenant general, and received the Order of the Black Eagle; at Hohenfriedberg in 1745, he commanded the cavalry charge claimed as a key factor in Prussian victory.

== Sources ==
- Anderson, Mark (1995). The War of the Austrian Succession. Routledge. ISBN 978-0582059504.
- Armour, Ian (2012). A History of Eastern Europe 1740–1918. Bloomsbury Academic Press. ISBN 978-1849664882.
- Berry, Jeff (30 March 2013). "Chotusitz 1742". Obscure Battles.
- Browning, Reed (1975). The Duke of Newcastle. Yale University. ISBN 9780300017465.
- Carlyle, Thomas (1873). History of Friedrich II. of Prussia: called Frederick the Great. Vol. 5. Chapman and Hall.
- Duffy, Christopher (2015). Frederick the Great: A Military Life. Routledge. ISBN 978-1138924659.
- Grant, RG (2011). 1001 Battles That Changed the Course of History. Universe Publishing (NY). ISBN 978-0789322333.
- Mitchell, Aaron Wess (2018). The Grand Strategy of the Habsburg Empire. Princeton University Press. ISBN 978-0691176703.
- Russell, Lord John (1829). Memoirs of the affairs of Europe from the Peace of Utrecht, Volume 2. John Murray.
- Showalter, Dennis (2012). Frederick the Great: A Military History. Frontline Books. ISBN 978-1848326408.
- Smollett, Tobias (1818). The History of England, from the Revolution in 1688 to the Death of George II, Volume 3. George Cowie & Co.
- Williams, Henry (1907). The Historians' History of the World: Germanic empires (concluded), Volume XV. George Cowie & Co.
