= Ujjain-Indore Road =

Road in Madhya Pradesh, India

The Ujjain-Indore Road is a metropolitan highway serving the city of Indore and Ujjain in Madhya Pradesh. The highway begins at the centre of the city i.e. Rajwada in Indore and ends at Ujjain Junction railway station in Ujjain. The road has major junctions at Sanwer Road Industrial Area, Sanwer Bypass and Ujjain Engineering College.
