= Militärhistorisches Museum Flugplatz Berlin-Gatow =

Bundeswehr Museum of Military History – Berlin-Gatow Airfield
- Militärhistorisches Museum der Bundeswehr – Flugplatz Berlin Gatow
- Official Logo as of October 2011
- Established: September 23, 1995
- Location: Berlin-Gatow, Germany
- Coordinates: 52°28′18″N 13°08′20″E
- Type: Military Museum
- Founder: Helmut Jaeckel
- Owner: Bundeswehr
- Public transit access: bus 135, stops Seekorso or Kurpromenade, Berliner Verkehrsbetriebe
- Parking: On site (no charge)
- Website: www.mhm-gatow.de

The Militärhistorisches Museum der Bundeswehr – Flugplatz Berlin-Gatow (Bundeswehr Museum of Military History – Berlin-Gatow Airfield; formally known as Luftwaffenmuseum der Bundeswehr) is the Berlin branch of the Bundeswehr Military History Museum. The museum acts as an independent military department.

The museum is in Berlin at a former Luftwaffe and Royal Air Force (RAF) airfield, RAF Gatow. The focus is on military history, particularly the history of the post-war German Air Force. The museum has a collection of more than 200,000 items, including 155 aeroplanes, 5,000 uniforms and 30,000 books. There are also displays (including aeroplanes) on the history of the airfield when it was used by the RAF.

Aircraft include World War I planes such as the Fokker E.III as reproductions, and World War II planes such as the Bf 109, as well as at least one aircraft of every type ever to serve in the air forces of East and West Germany. Most of those postwar aircraft are stored outside on the tarmac and runways, however, and many are in bad condition. There are long term restoration projects, including a Focke-Wulf Fw 190. Because of that the museum is under construction, some exhibits are shortly removed for restoration, repainting or lending to other museums.

== History ==
The museum traces its beginnings to 1957, when a former government official named Helmut Jaeckel started acquiring the personal collections of Wehrmacht soldiers and displaying them at Uetersen Airfield. In 1963 a board of trustees was founded to run the new museum. However, due to financial difficulties, operation of the museum was handed over to the Bundeswehr in 1987. From 1995 to 1996 the museum was relocated to the former airbase at RAF Gatow.

== Buildings ==
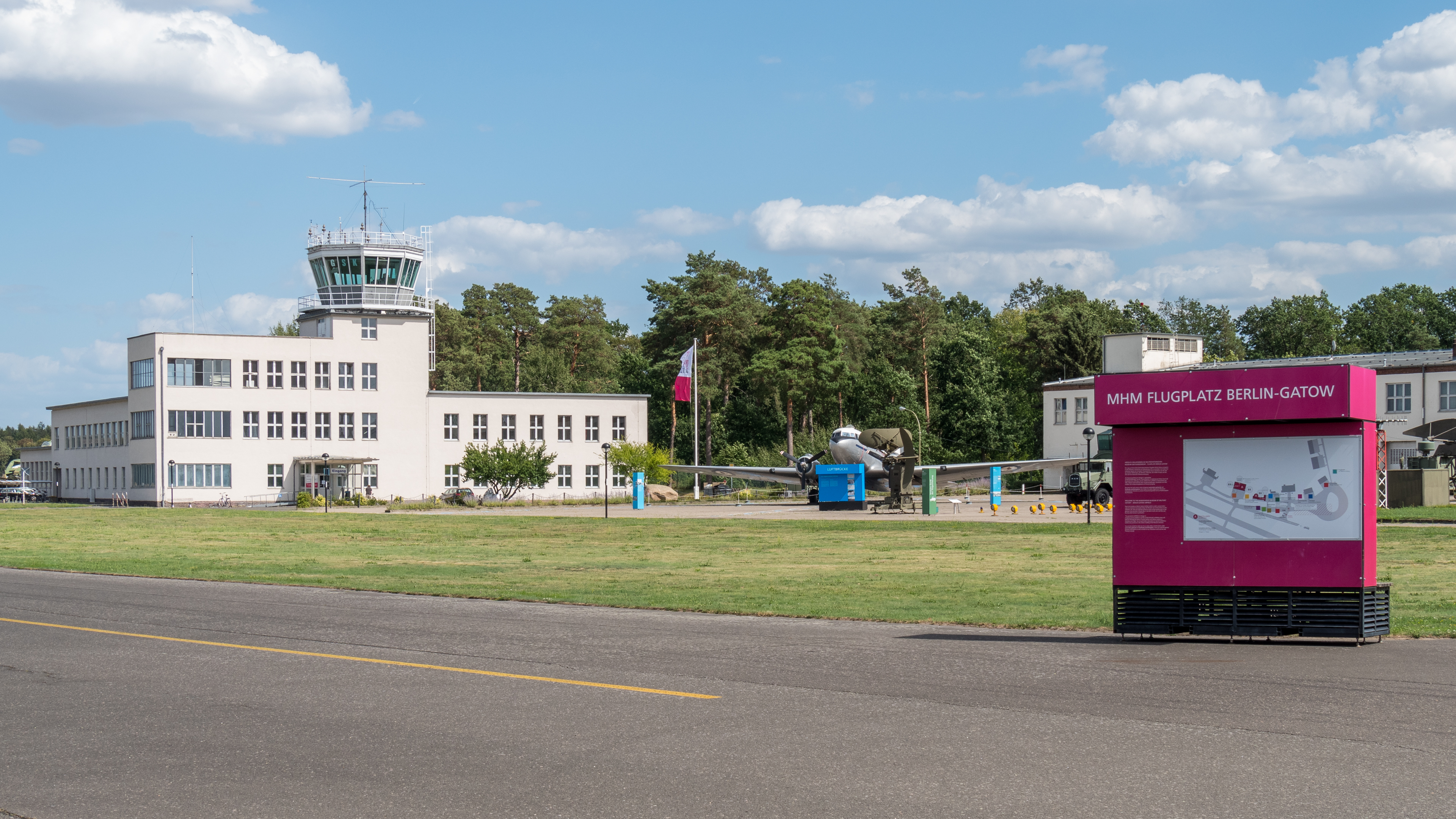
Military History Museum (MHM)

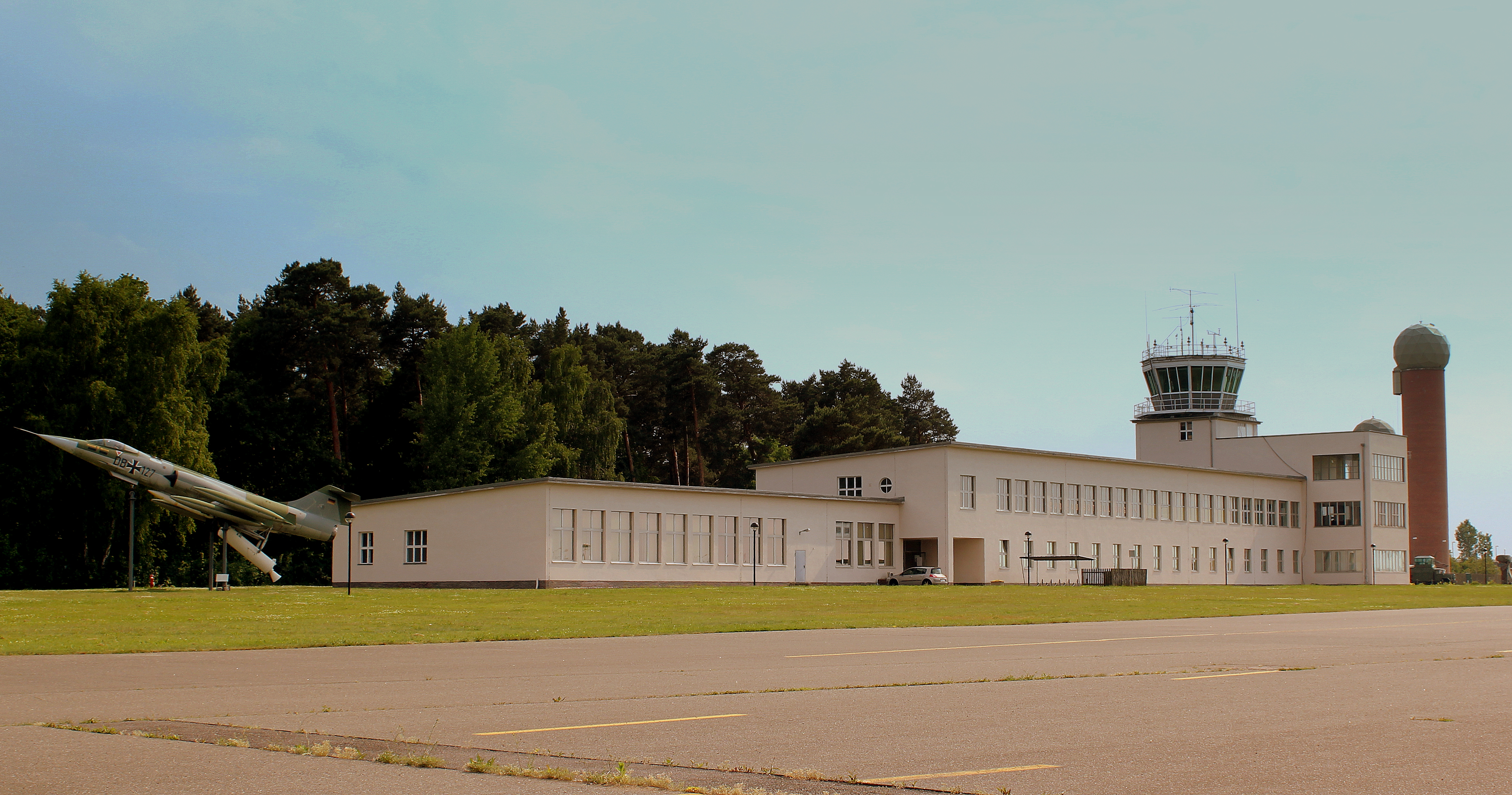
Tower – exhibitions

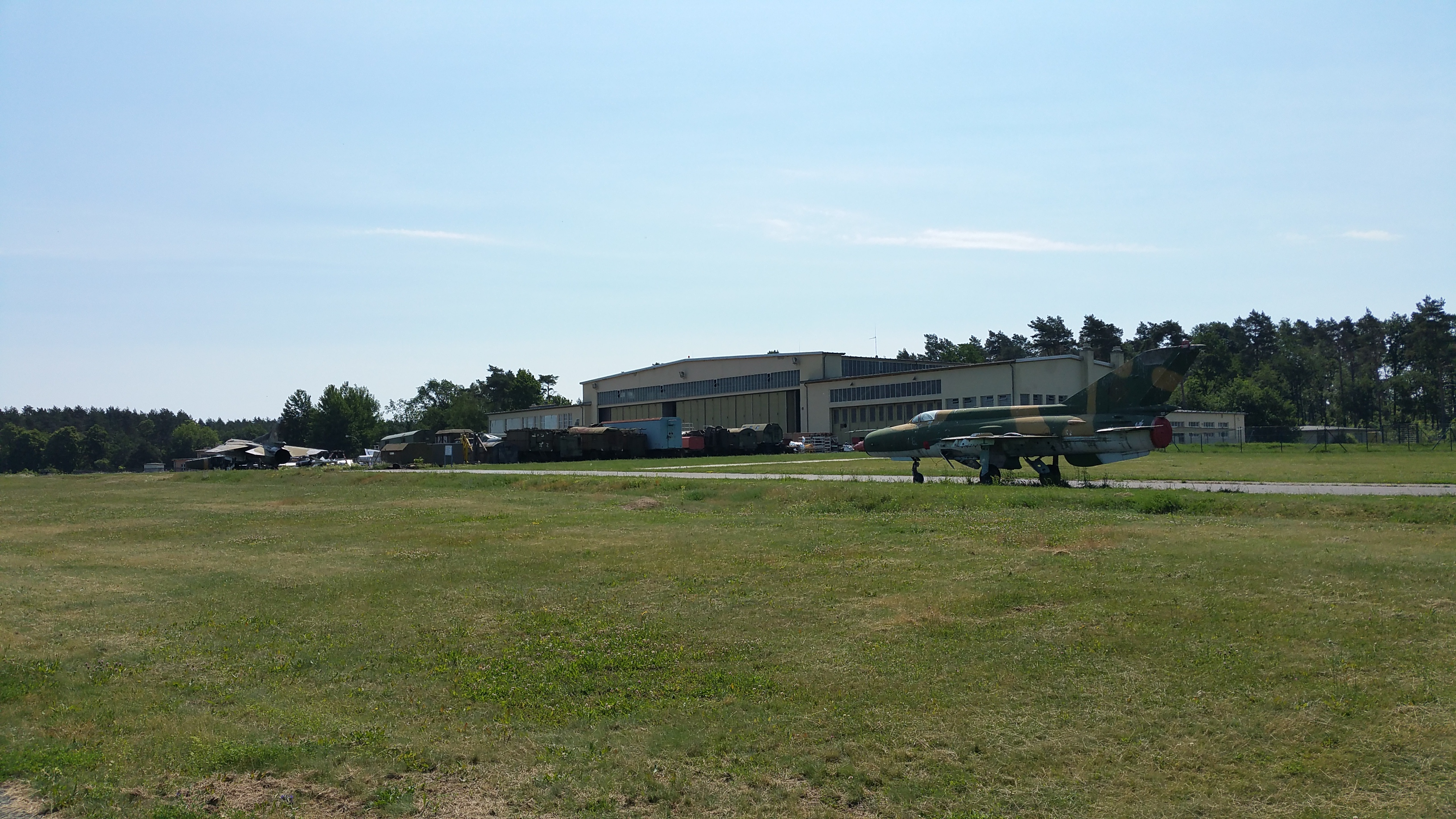
Hangar 1 – restoration

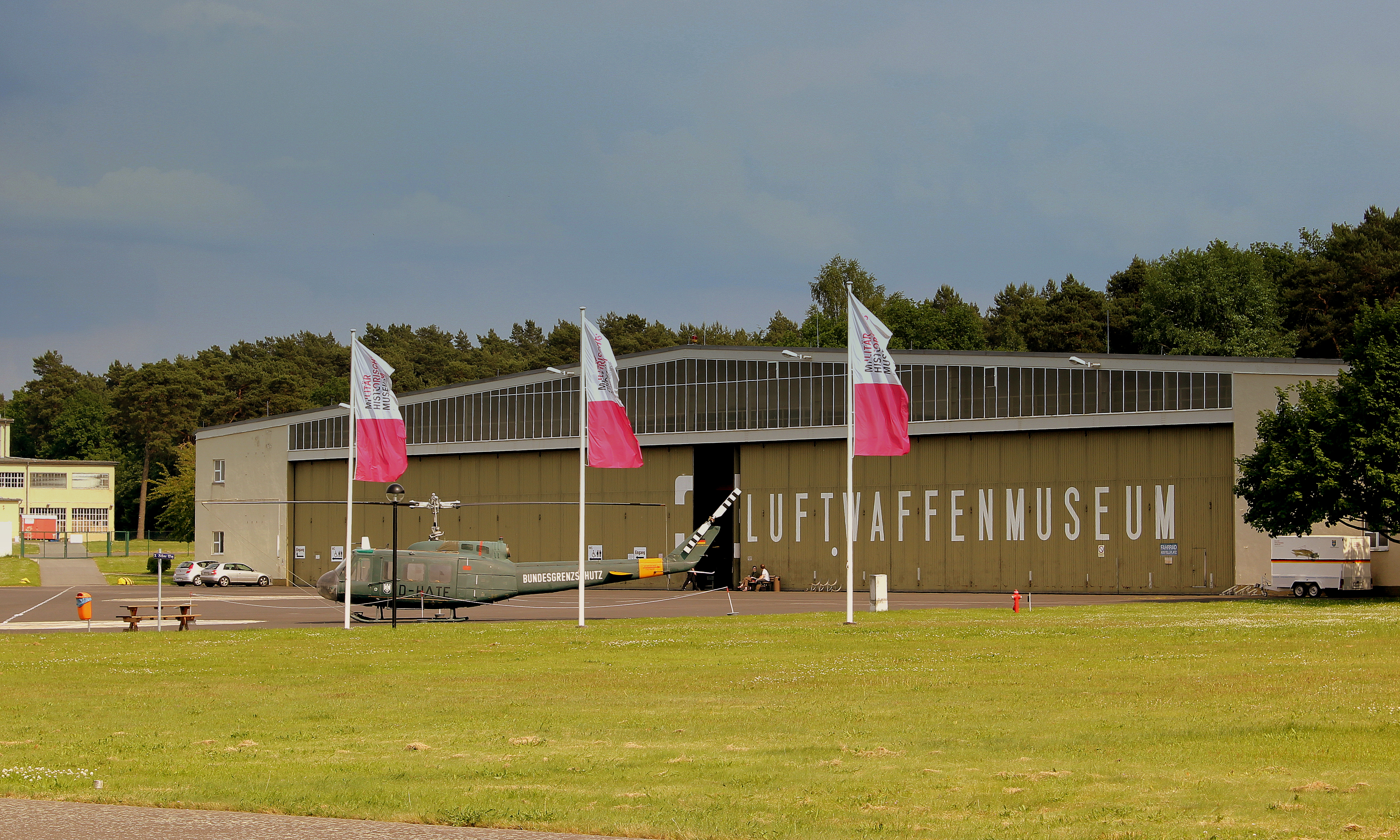
Hangar 3 – exhibitions

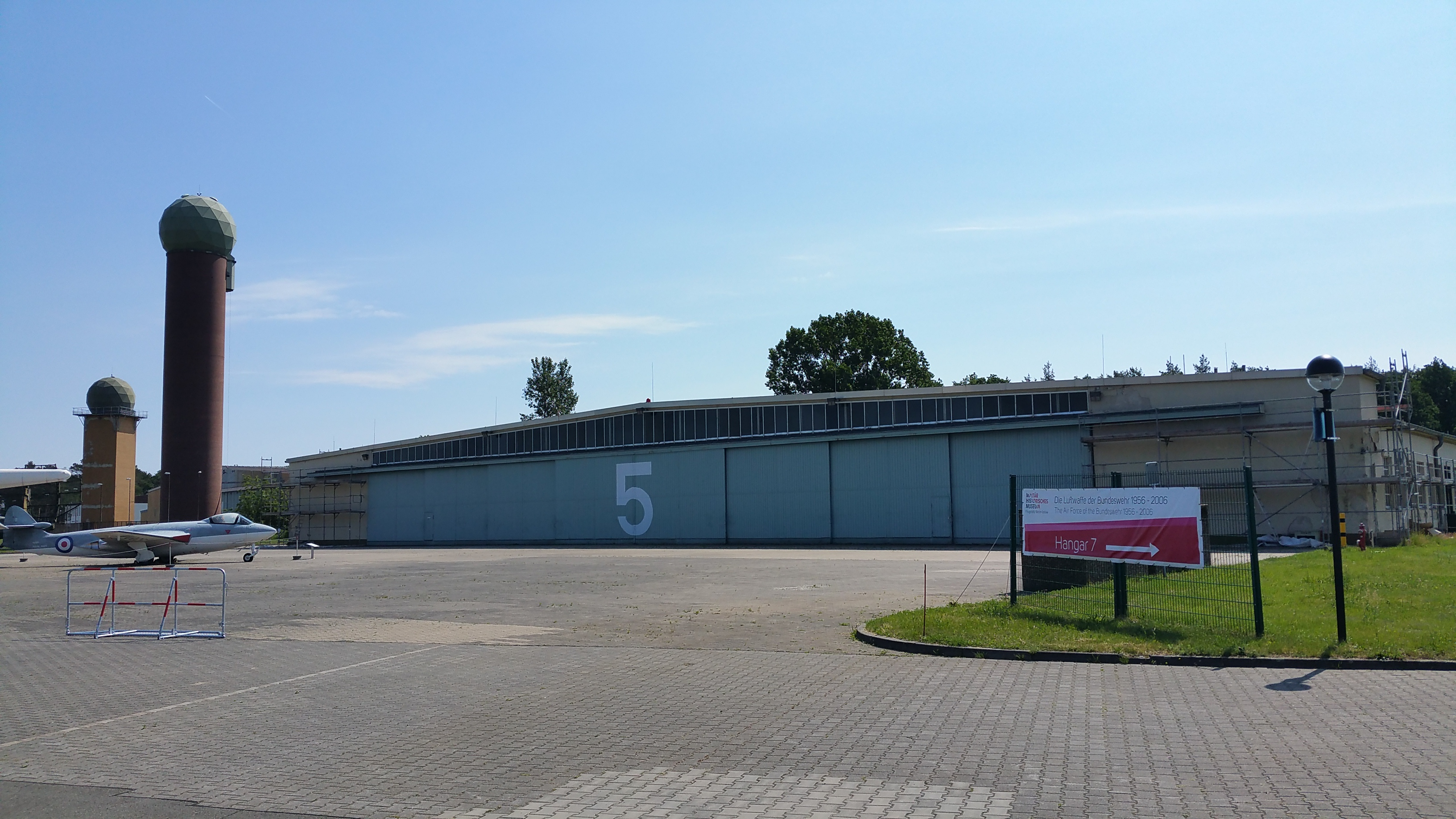
Hangar 5 – depot

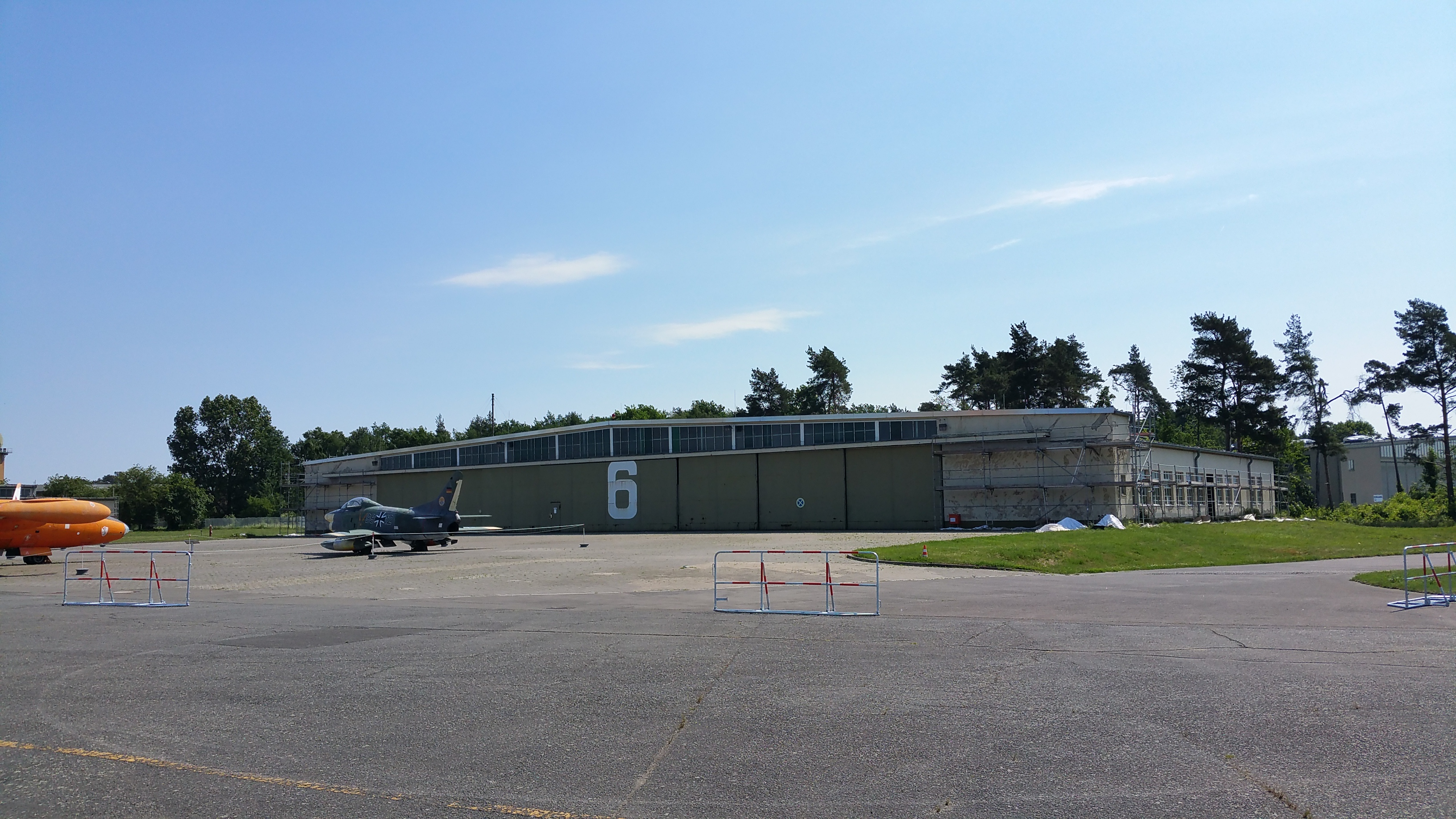
Hangar 6 – depot

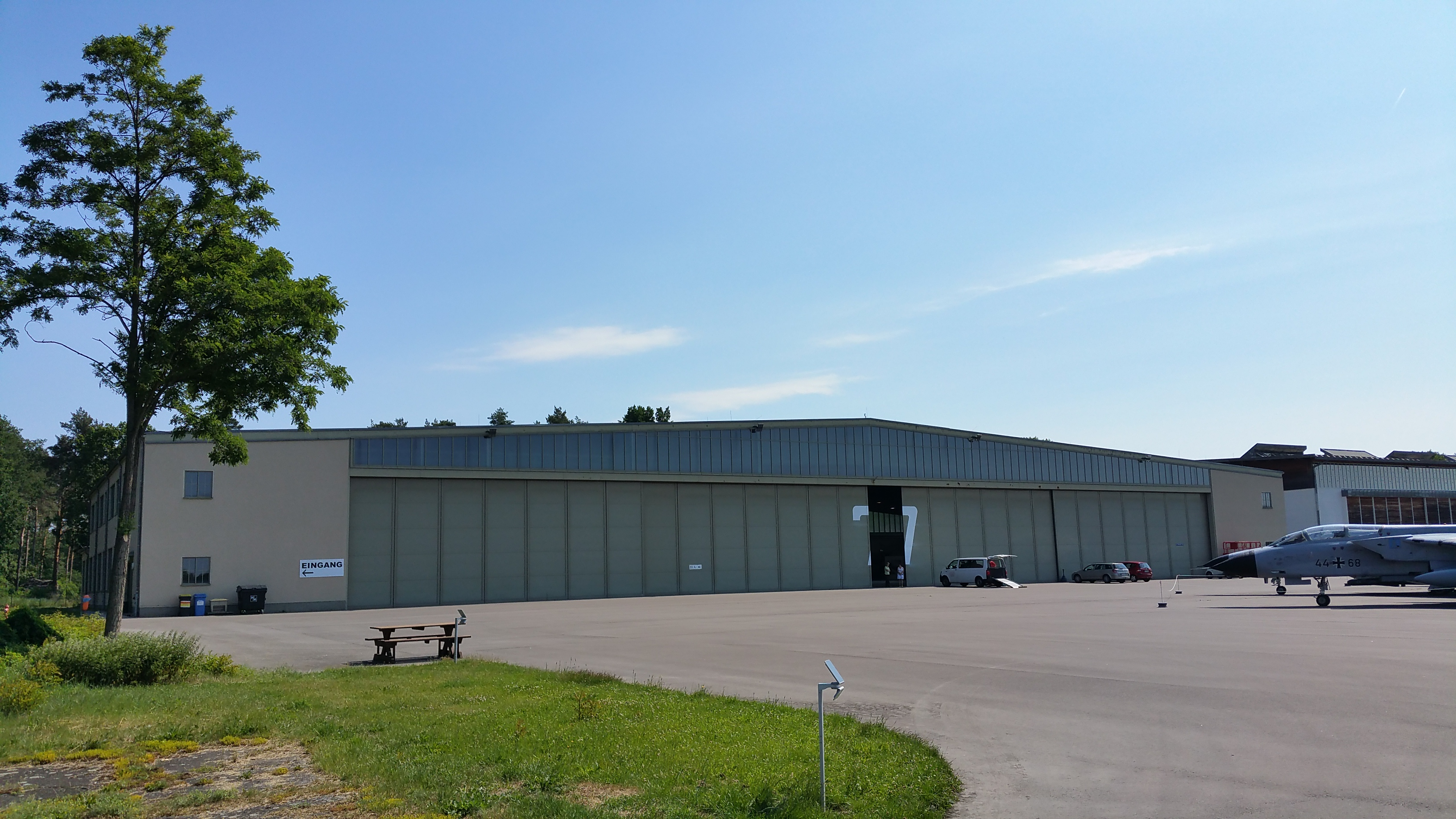
Hangar 7 – exhibitions

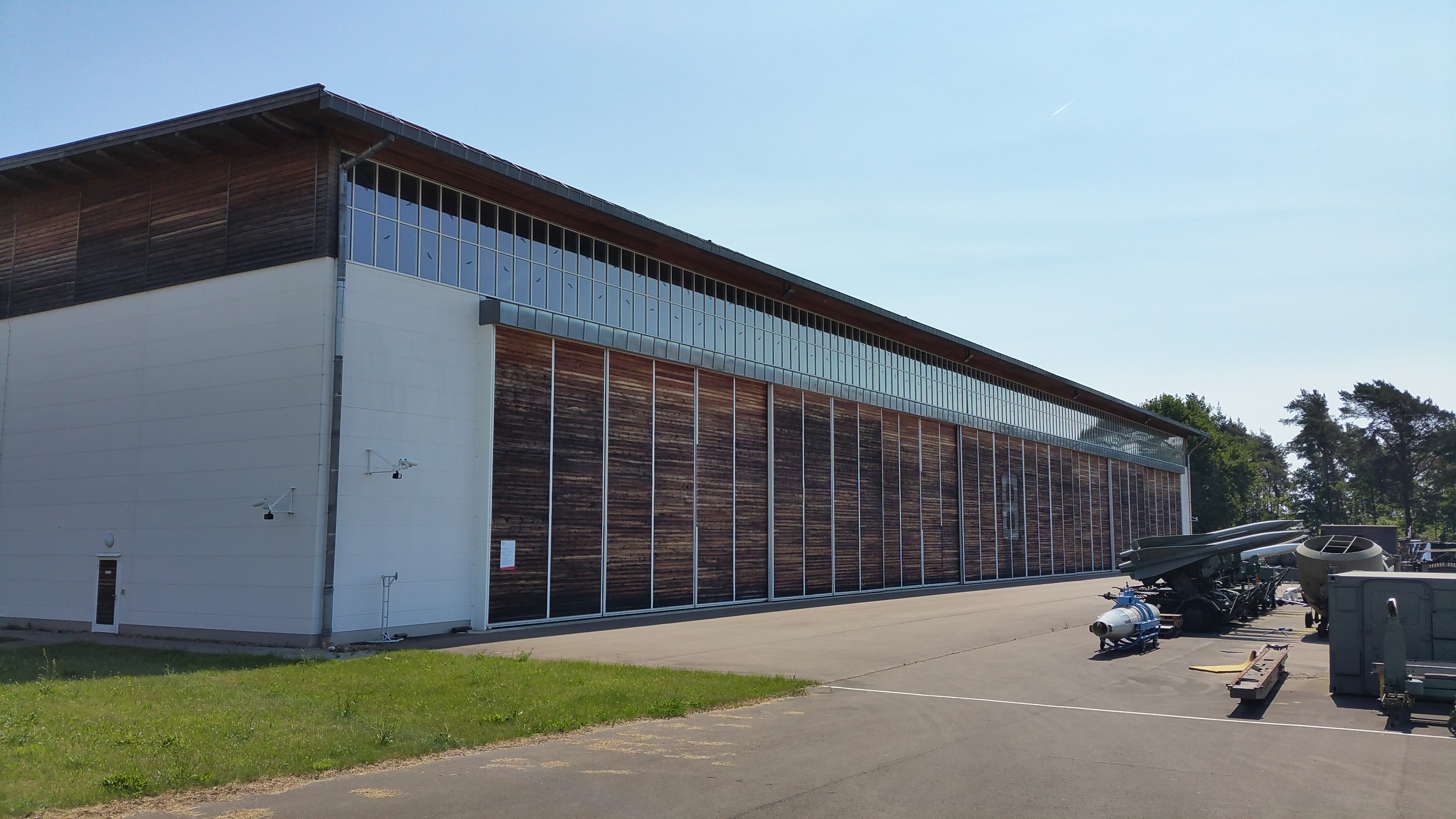
Hangar 8 – depot

== Collection ==
Do note that some of the aircraft are not viewable by the public or have been moved to different locations,

=== Aeroplanes up to 1945 ===
Country of Origin	Model / Nickname	Location	Picture
Australia	Douglas C-47	original A65-69 from: Deutsches Technikmuseum Berlin next to Tower	
United Kingdom	Avro 504K	Reproduction hangar 3	
Germany	Bücker Bü 181	hangar 3	
Spain	CASA 2.111		
Germany	DFS 230	Reproduction hangar 3	
France	Farman III	Reproduction hangar 3	
Germany	Fieseler Fi 156 Storch	Reproduction hangar 3	
Germany	Fokker D VII (F)	Reproduction hangar 3	
Germany	Fokker Dr.I	Reproduction hangar 3	
Germany	Fokker E.III	Reproduction hangar 3	
Germany	Grunau Baby II	original hangar 3	
Germany	Junkers J 9 (DI)	Reproduction hangar 3	
Germany	Etrich-Rumpler Taube	Reproduction hangar 3	
Germany	Messerschmitt Bf 108 Taifun	wreck	
Spain	Hispano Aviación HA-1112	hangar 3	
Germany	Messerschmitt Me 163	original hangar 3	
Germany	DFS SG 38 Schulgleiter	original hangar 3	
Germany	Siebel Si 204	original depot	
Germany	Siemens-Schuckert D.III	Reproduction hangar 3	

=== NATO aeroplanes ===
Country of Origin	Model / Nickname	Location	Picture
Germany	Breguet 1150 Atlantic; 61+17	original open air	
Germany	Canadair CL-13B Sabre Mk.6; D-9542	original open air	
France	Dassault Mirage III; 13-OL	original open air	
France	Dassault Super Mystère; 10-SA	original open air	
Germany	Dassault/Dornier Alpha Jet; 41+50	original hangar 7	
United Kingdom	DHC-1 Chipmunk T-10; WG466	hangar 3	
Germany	Dornier Do-27; 57+38	original hangar 7	
Germany	Dornier Do-28 D-2; 59+20	original open air	
Germany	English Electric Canberra; 99+35	original open air	
United Kingdom	English Electric Lightning F.2A; XN730	original open air	
Germany	Fairey Gannet AS.4; UA+106	original open air	
Germany	Fiat G-91 R3; 99+12	original open air	
Germany	Fiat G-91 R4; 35+41	original open air	
Germany	Fiat G-91 T3; 99+40	original open air	
Germany	Fouga CM.170 Magister; AA+014	original hangar 7	
United Kingdom	Gloster Meteor NF.11	original open air	
United Kingdom	Hawker Harrier GR Mk.1; XV278	original open air	
United Kingdom	Hawker Sea Hawk Mk.4; WV865	original open air	
United Kingdom	Hawker Hunter F Mk.6; XG152	original open air	
Germany	Hamburger Flugzeugbau HFB-320 Hansa Jet Hansa-Jet ECM; 16+26	original open air	
Germany	Hunting Percival P.66 Pembroke C.Mk. 54; AS-558	original open air	
Germany	Lockheed F-104G Starfighter; 26+49	original open air	
Germany	Lockheed F-104G Starfighter; 20+37	original hangar 3	
Germany	Lockheed F-104G Starfighter on Zero-length launcher DB+127	original open air (next to tower building)	
Germany	Lockheed TF-104G Starfighter; 27+90	original open air	
Germany	Lockheed F-104F Starfighter; 29+06	original hangar 7	
Germany	Lockheed T-33A; 9455	original open air	
United States	Cessna T-37B; 65-10824 EN	original hangar 7	
Germany	McDonnell Douglas F-4F Phantom II; 38+34	original hangar 7	
Germany	McDonnell Douglas RF-4E Phantom II; 35+62	original open air	
Germany	Nord Aviation N2501D Noratlas; 99+14	original open air	
Germany	North American F-86K Sabre; 55-4881 as JD-249	original open air	
Germany	North American Harvard; AA+615	original hangar 7	
Germany	Panavia Tornado IDS; 44+68	original hangar 7	
Germany	Piaggio P.149; 90+78	original open air	
Germany	Piper PA-18 Super Cub; AS+525	original hangar 3 (Decke)	
Germany	Pützer Elster; 97+03	original depot	
Germany	Raab Doppelraab IV; D-3547	original depot	
Germany	Republic F-84F Thunderstreak; DF-316	original hangar 7	
Germany	Republic RF-84F Thunderflash; EB-344	original open air	
Germany	Rockwell OV-10B Bronco; 99+33	original open air	
Germany	C-160 Transall; 50+56	original open air	

=== Warsaw Pact aeroplanes ===
Country of Origin	Model / Nickname	Location	Picture
East Germany	Antonov An-2; 822	original depot	
Germany	Antonov An-26; 52+09, ex 369	original open air	
East Germany	Ilyushin Il-28; 208	original open air	
East Germany	Yakovlev Yak-11; 225	original hangar 3	
East Germany	Yakovlev Yak-18; 25	original depot	
East Germany	Let L-29 Delfin; 311	original open air	
East Germany	Let L-39V Albatros; 28–48, ex 170	original open air	
East Germany	Let L-410 UVP; 53+10, ex 318	original open air	
Czechoslovakia	Mikoyan-Gurevich MiG-15bis; 3905	original open air	
East Germany	Mikoyan-Gurevich MiG-17F; 346	original open air	
East Germany	Mikoyan-Gurevich MiG-17PF	original open air	
East Germany	Mikoyan-Gurevich MiG-21M; 596	original open air	
East Germany	Mikoyan-Gurevich MiG-21UM; 23–77, ex 256	original open air	
East Germany	Mikoyan-Gurevich MiG-21F-13; 645	original open air	
East Germany	Mikoyan-Gurevich MiG-23BN; 20–51, ex 710	original open air	
East Germany	Mikoyan-Gurevich MiG-23MF; 20–02, ex 577	original open air	
East Germany	Mikoyan-Gurevich MiG-29G; 29+03, ex 615	original hangar 7	
East Germany	Sukhoi Su-22M4; 25+44, ex 798	original open air	
East Germany	Zlín Z 43; D-ENVA, ex 17	original open air	

=== Helicopters ===
Country of Origin	Model / Nickname	Location	Picture
Germany	Alouette II; 76+03	original depot	
Germany	Alouette II; 75+46	original depot	
Germany	Bell UH-1D Iroquois; 71+42	original hangar 7	
Germany	Bell UH-1D Iroquois; D-HATE	original open air	
Germany	Boeing Vertol/Piasecki H-21; 83+08	original hangar 3	
Germany	Bristol Type 171 Sycamore HR.52; 78+04	original hangar 7	
Germany	MBB Bo-105; 98+20	original open air	
Germany	MBB Bo-105	original hangar 7	
East Germany	Mil Mi-2; 94+63, ex 393	original open air	
East Germany	Mil Mi-4A; 565	original open air	
Germany	Mil Mi-8S; 93+51, ex 914	original open air	
East Germany	Mil Mi-8T; 93+14, ex 927	original open air	
Germany	Mil Mi-9; 93+92, ex 411	original open air	
East Germany	Mil Mi-24D; 5211, ex 521	original open air	
East Germany	Mil Mi-24P; 96+43, ex 387	original open air	
Germany	Saunders Roe Skeeter	original hangar 3	
Germany	Sikorsky H-34G; 80+34	original hangar 7	

=== Unmanned systems ===
Country of Origin	Model	Location	Picture
Germany	Canadair CL-89 (AN/USD-501)	original hangar 7	
Germany	Canadair CL-289 (AN/USD-502)	original hangar 7	
Germany	Fritz X	original depot	
Germany	Henschel Hs 293 A-1	original hangar 3	
Germany; United States	MGM-1 Matador	original open air (next to hangar 7)	
Germany	MGM-31 Pershing	original open air (next to hangar 7)	
Germany	TUCAN-95	original hangar 7	
Germany	Rauchspurautomat 160, Schwarz-Propellerwerke Berlin	original depot	
Germany	Q2 (FM)	original hangar 7	

=== Anti-aircraft and radar systems ===
Country of Origin	Model	Location	Picture
Germany	2-cm-Flak 38	original depot	
Germany	Rheinmetall Flak 20 mm Zwillig	original hangar 7	
East Germany	ZU-23-2	original depot	
Germany	Bofors 40 mm gun	original hangar 7	
Germany	Flak 8,8	original hangar 3	
Germany	150 cm Flak-Scheinwerfer 34	original hangar 3	
Germany	Nike Hercules	original open air	
East Germany	S-200 Vega	original open air	
Germany	MIM-23 Hawk	original open air	
Germany	loading vehicle XM 501 for Hawk	original hangar 3	
Germany	MIM-104 Patriot	original open air	
East Germany	S-75 Dvina	original open air	
East Germany	Petschora S-125M	original open air	
Germany	Roland 2	original open air (next to hangar 7)	
Germany	Flakortungsgerät FuMG 65; Würzburg radar	original open air	
Germany	radar ASR-B	original open air	
Germany	radar BWB 23342 ARTUS Type ME 0632 GxJ/2	original open air	
Germany	radar FPN-36	original open air	
Germany	NP 510 (UHF-tracking)	original open air (next to hangar 7)	
Germany	radar PAR-C	original open air	
East Germany	KRTP-86 TAMARA	original open air	
United States	Westinghouse AN/TPS-43	original open air	
East Germany	Ramona KRTP-81/81M	original open air	
East Germany	Ural-375A with secondary radar 1L22 Parol	original open air	

=== Vehicles ===
Country of Origin	Model	Location	Picture
Germany	MAN 630 5t t-mil with portable tower	original open air (next to tower building)	
Germany	mobile tower FSA-90	original open air (next to tower building)	
Germany	Clarktor CT 30 Pushback Tractor	original hangar 7	
Germany	DKW Munga 4 (Typ F91/4)	original hangar 7	
Germany	calibration laboratory trailer	original open air	
Germany	NSU Kettenkraftrad HK 101	original hangar 3	
Germany	Hercules K 125 BW	original hangar 7	
Germany	Magirus-Deutz tanking vehicle	original open air	
Germany	MAN tanking vehicle	original open air	
Germany	MJ1 VW bomb loading vehicle	original hangar 7	
East Germany	Kleinkübelwagen P 601 A	original hangar 7	
Germany	Volkswagen 181	original hangar 7	
East Germany	Ural-4320	original open air	

=== Engines ===
Country of Origin	Model	Location	Picture
Germany	Oberursel U0	hangar 3	
United Kingdom	Clerget Humber BR-1	hangar 3 (adjoining room)	
Germany	BMW 801 D	hangar 3	
Germany	Daimler Benz DB 603 A	original unrestauriert depot	
Germany	Daimler Benz DB 605 A	original hangar 3 (adjoining room)	
Germany	Junkers Jumo 213 AG-1	original hangar 3	
Germany	BMW 003	hangar 3 (adjoining room)	
Germany	Junkers Jumo 004	original unrestauriert hangar 3 (adjoining room)	
Germany	Walter HWK 109-500	original hangar 3 (adjoining room)	
Germany	Walter HWK 109-509A	original hangar 3 (adjoining room)	
United States	Allison J33	original hangar 3 (adjoining room)	
United Kingdom	Armstrong Siddeley Double Mamba-ASMD-3	original depot engine collection	
Soviet Union	Klimov RD-33	original depot engine collection	
Soviet Union	Klimov TV3-117	original depot engine collection	
Soviet Union	Klimov VK-1A	original hangar 3 (adjoining room)	
United States	General Electric J79-GE-11A	original depot engine collection	
Soviet Union	Lyulka AL-21 F3	original depot engine collection	Ljulka AL-21 F3
Germany	Turbo-Union RB199	original depot engine collection	
