= Pützer Elster =

Light aircraft

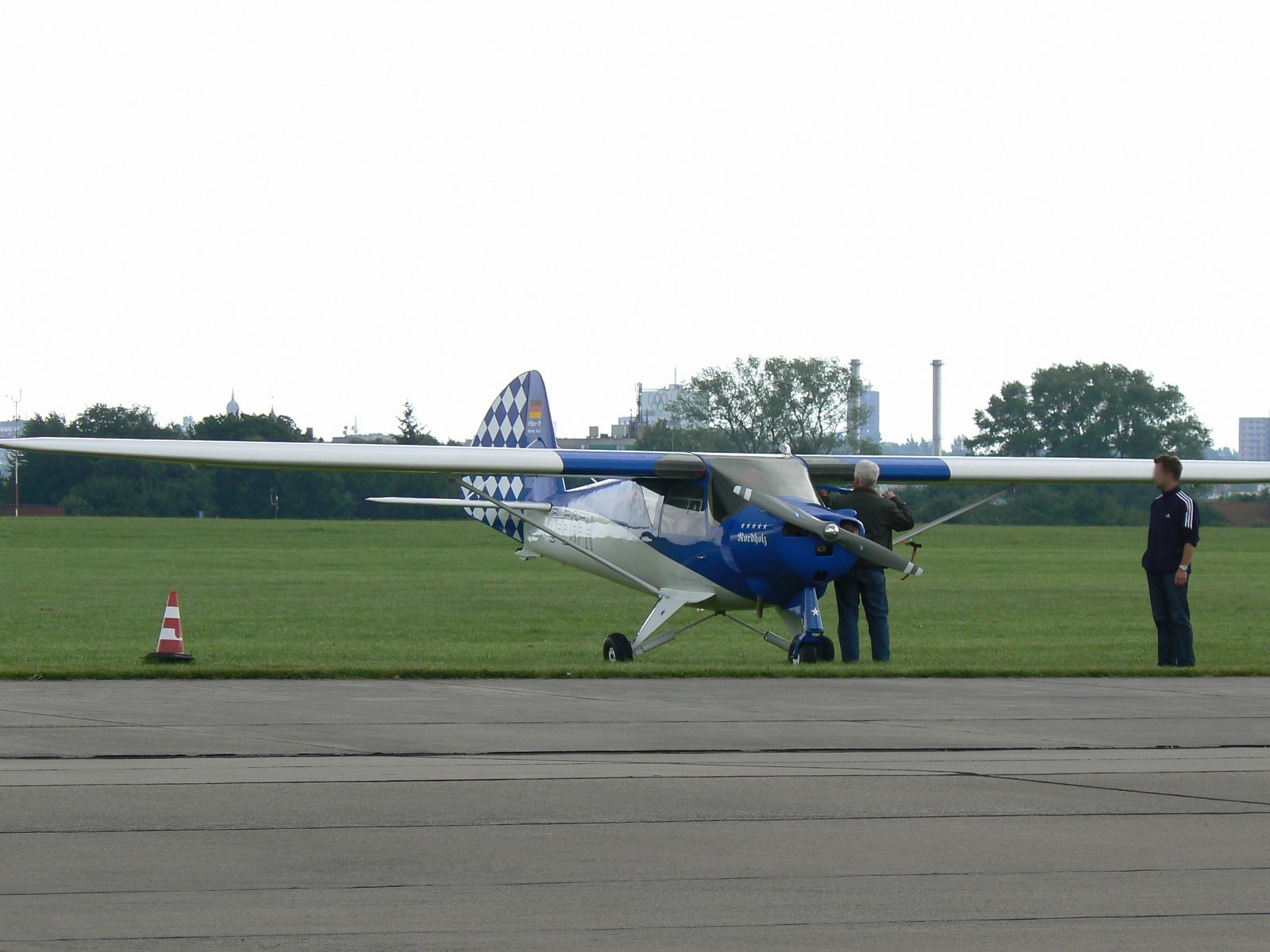
- Pützer Elster B

General information
- Type: Light recreational aircraft
- Manufacturer: Pützer
- Designer: Alfons Pützer
- Status: In civilian use
- Primary user: Luftwaffe
- Number built: 45

History
- First flight: 10 January 1959
- Developed from: Pützer Doppelraab, Pützer Motorraab

The Pützer Elster was a German single-engined light aircraft, manufactured by Alfons Pützer KG (later Sportavia) in Bonn. It served with the Luftwaffe and Marineflieger and was used solely for recreational sport flying. Some continue to fly in 2020 in private ownership.

== Development history ==
The Pützer Elster "Magpie" was developed from the Motorraab motor glider which had itself been developed from the Doppelraab glider. The Elster was the first aircraft produced in Germany after World War II in any significant numbers. The design shared the wing of the Doppelraab, braced by metal struts, but was given a new monocoque fuselage constructed of plywood with seats for two occupants arranged side by side. The tricycle landing gear unusually featured a steerable nosewheel controlled by a hand grip. Production ceased in 1967, by which time 45 examples had been built.

== Variants ==
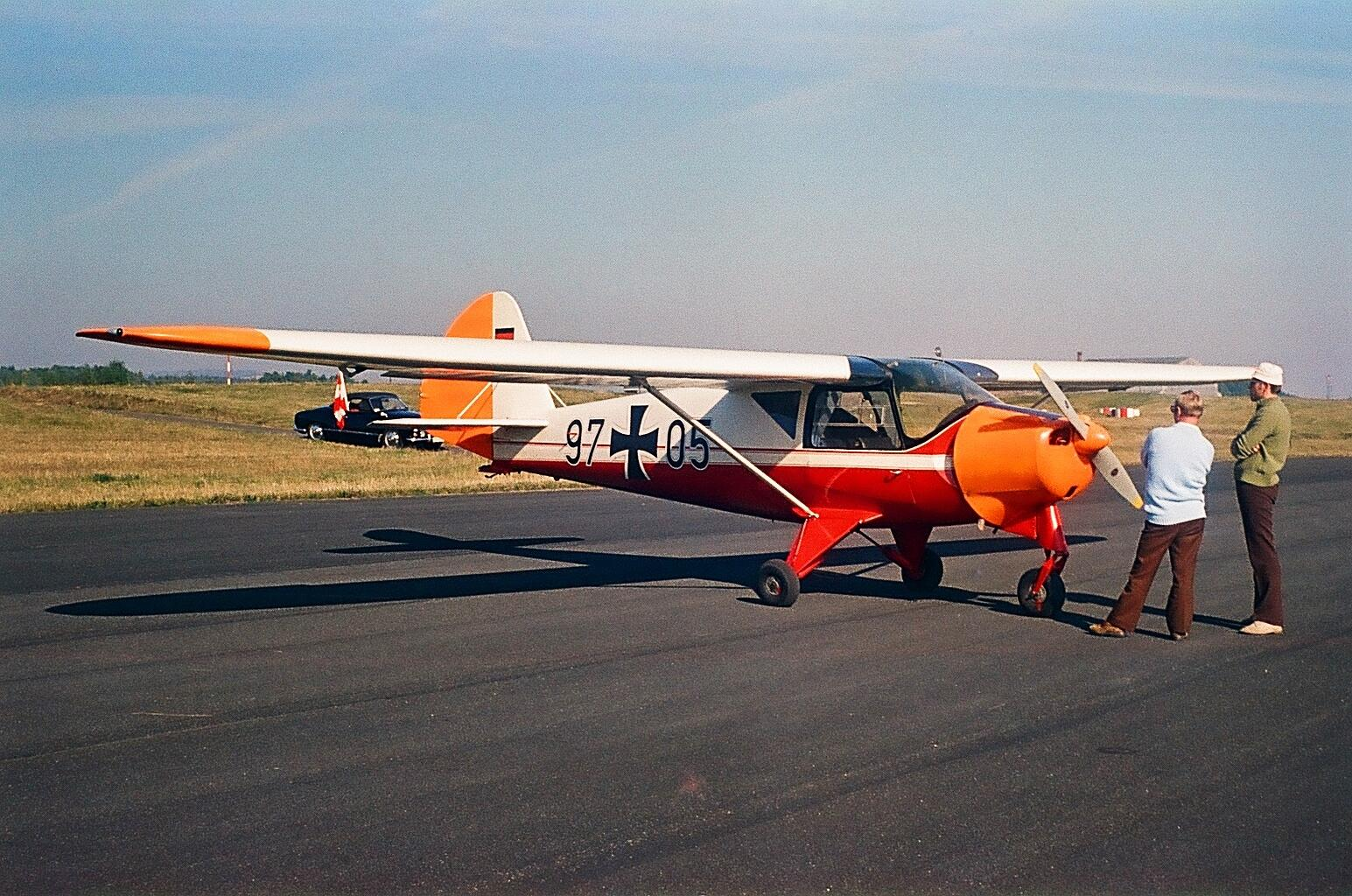
Elster B of Luftwaffe, Pferdsfeld air base 1972

=== Elster ===
Prototype aircraft fitted with a 52 hp Porsche 678/3 engine, first flight 10 January 1959.

=== Elster B ===
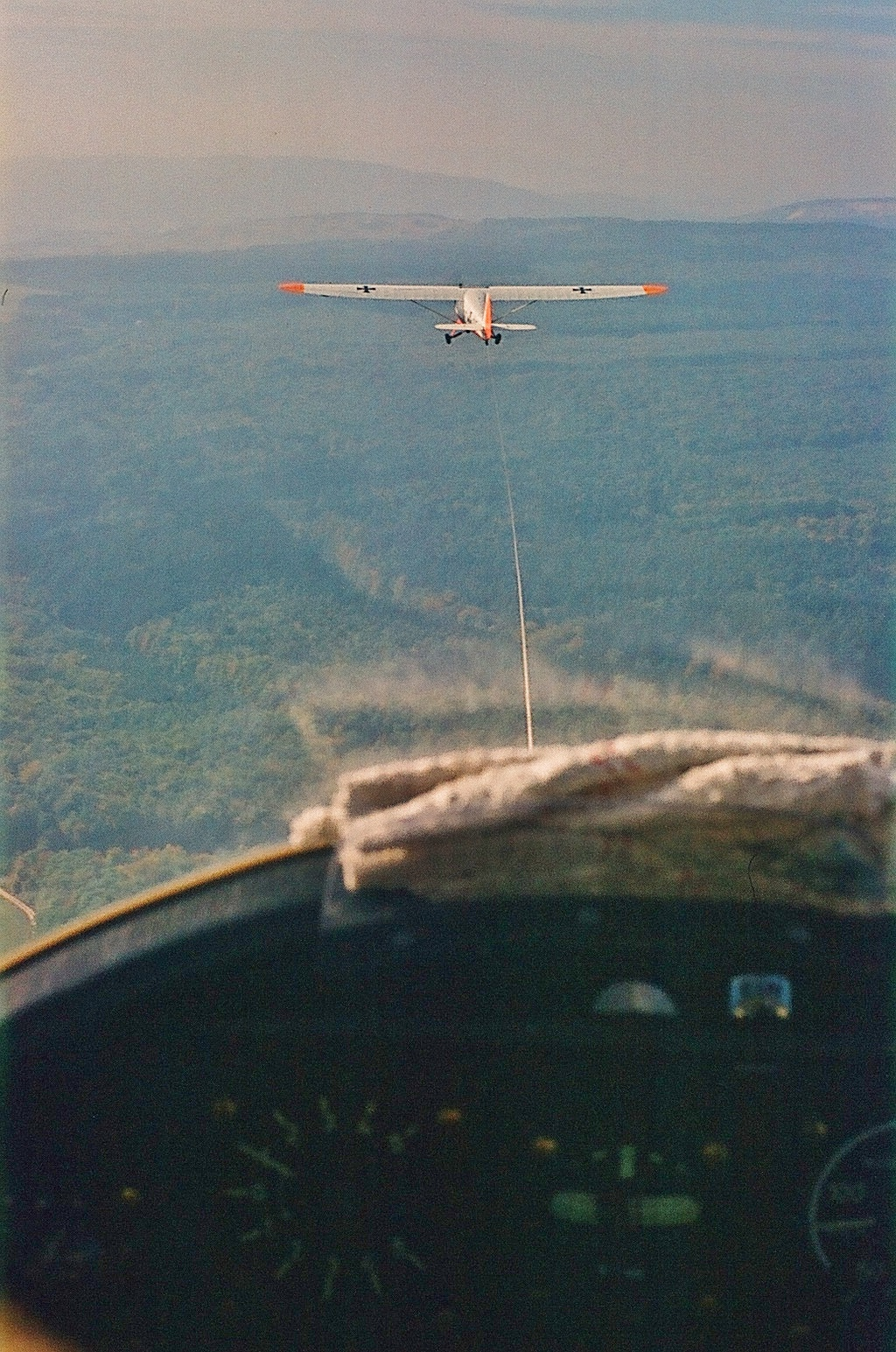
Elster of Luftwaffe used as glider tug, Pferdsfeld air base 1972

Main production version fitted with a 95 hp Continental C-90 engine. 25 aircraft were operated by the Luftwaffe and Marineflieger sport flying groups. These aircraft were initially operated with civilian registrations but were allocated military serials in 1971. In 1978 the maintenance contract with Pützer expired and the aircraft were placed on the civil market.

=== Elster C ===
The Elster C was fitted with the more powerful 150 hp Lycoming O-320 engine and other modifications for use as a glider tug.

== Operators ==
=== Military operators ===
Germany

- Luftwaffe
- Marineflieger

== Specifications (Pützer Elster B) ==
Data from Jane's All the World's Aircraft 1962-63

General characteristics

- Crew: 1
- Capacity: 1 pax / student
- Length: 7.1 m (23 ft 4 in)
- Wingspan: 13.22 m (43 ft 4 in)
- Height: 2.5 m (8 ft 2 in)
- Wing area: 17.5 m^{2} (188 sq ft)
- Empty weight: 460 kg (1,014 lb)
- Max takeoff weight: 700 kg (1,543 lb)
- Fuel capacity: 64 L (17 US gal; 14 imp gal) in two tanks aft of the seats
- Powerplant: 1 × Continental C90-12F 4-cylinder air-cooled horizontally-opposed piston engine, 71 kW (95 hp)
- Propellers: 2-bladed Hoffmann, 1.83 m (6 ft 0 in) diameter wooden fixed-pitch propeller

Performance

- Maximum speed: 168 km/h (104 mph, 91 kn) at sea level
- Cruise speed: 150 km/h (93 mph, 81 kn)
- Stall speed: 74 km/h (46 mph, 40 kn)
- Never exceed speed: 180 km/h (110 mph, 97 kn)
- Range: 450 km (280 mi, 240 nmi)
- Service ceiling: 5,000 m (16,000 ft) ~
- Rate of climb: 3.7 m/s (720 ft/min)
- Wing loading: 38.9 kg/m^{2} (8.0 lb/sq ft)
- Power/mass: 0.1011 kW/kg (0.0615 hp/lb)
- Take-off distance to 15 m (49 ft): 240 m (787 ft)
- Landing distance from 15 m (49 ft): 190 m (623 ft)

== See also ==
Aircraft of comparable role, configuration, and era

- Piper PA-22 Tripacer
