= Mierzęcin, Lubusz Voivodeship =

Mierzęcin
- Village
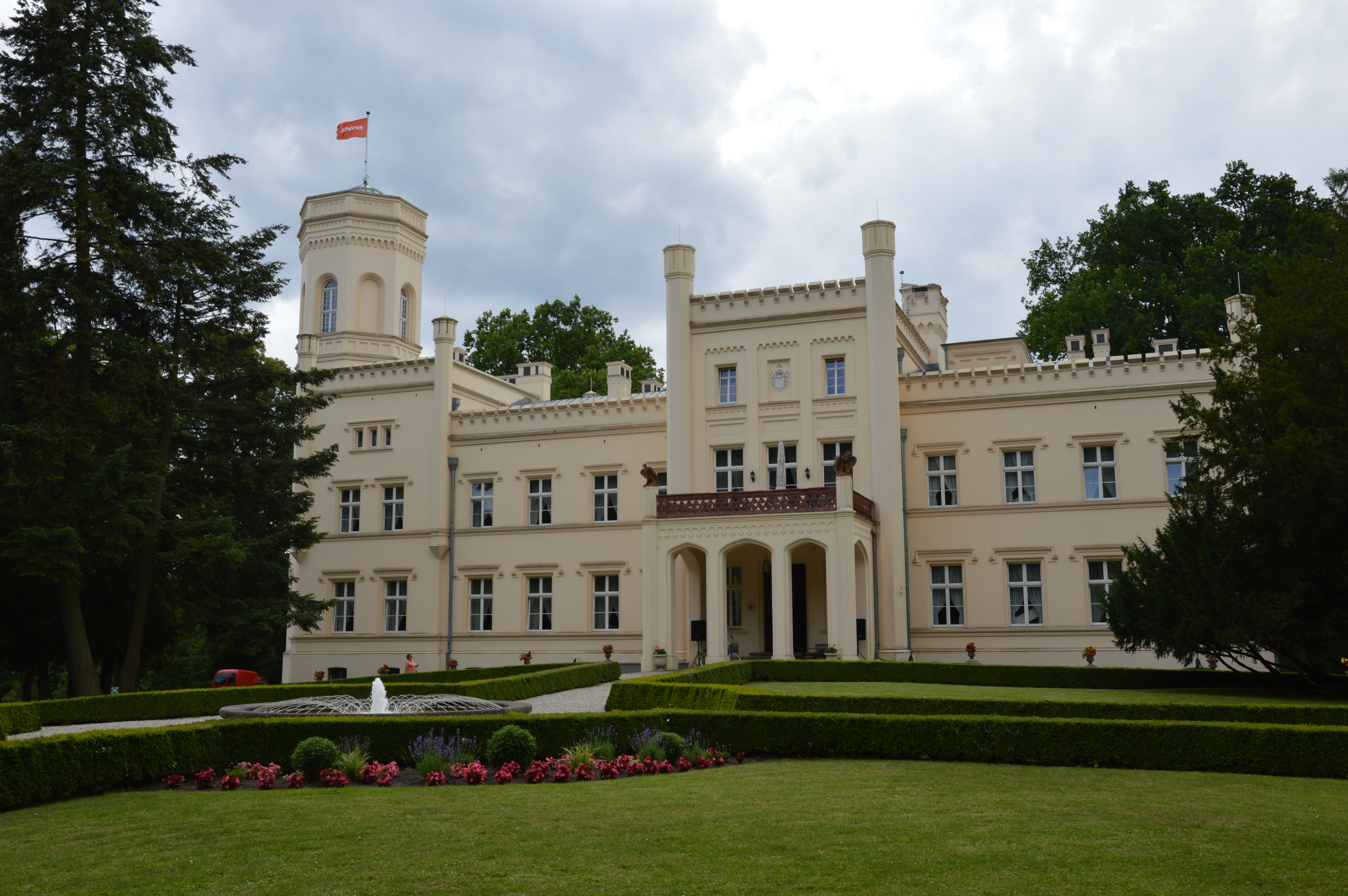
- Mierzęcin Palace

- Location within Poland
- Coordinates: 52°57′N 15°50′E
- Country: Poland
- Voivodeship: Lubusz
- County: Strzelce-Drezdenko
- Gmina: Dobiegniew
- Population: 350
- Time zone: UTC+1 (CET)
  - Summer (DST): UTC+2 (CEST)
- Vehicle registration: FSD

Mierzęcin [mjɛˈʐɛnt͡ɕin] (German: Mehrenthin) is a village in the administrative district of Gmina Dobiegniew, within Strzelce-Drezdenko County, Lubusz Voivodeship, in western Poland.

The village has a population of 350.

== History ==
During World War II, on April 1, 1942, the village was the site of a public execution of a 34-year-old Polish man, unfoundedly accused of raping a German girl. The Gestapo carried out the execution despite the opposition to the charge from the local village chief, the population and the girl's family.

== Notable people ==
- Friedrich Siegmund von Waldow (1682-1743), Prussian General
