= Wilhelm Dietrich von Buddenbrock =

Prussian general (1672–1757)

Wilhelm Dietrich Freiherr von Buddenbrock
- Von Buddenbrock circa 1710–20
- Born: 15 March 1672; Tilsemischken near Ragnit in the Duchy of Prussia
- Died: 28 March 1757 (aged 85); Breslau
- Title: Governor of Breslau

Von Buddenbrock circa 1720-1730

Wilhelm Dietrich Freiherr von Buddenbrock (15 March 1672 – 28 March 1757) was a Prussian Generalfeldmarschall and cavalry leader.

== Biography ==
Buddenbrock was born on 15 March 1672 to Elisabeth Sophia von Rappe and Johann von Buddenbrock in Tilsemischken (now Nemansky District) near Ragnit in the Duchy of Prussia. His family, Westphalian in origin, had settled in the Livonian Confederation in 1318 and in Ducal Prussia in 1622.

After studying at the Albertina University of Königsberg for three years, Buddenbrock enlisted in the Prussian Army and campaigned in the Netherlands in 1690. As an 18-year-old cornet in an Anhalt cuirassier regiment, Buddenbrock fought in the Battle of Fleurus. His regiment participated in the major battles of the War of the Spanish Succession, and Buddenbrock was regimental commander at Malplaquet in 1709. He was promoted to Oberst of the 1st Prussian Cuirassier Regiment on 18 July 1724.

Buddenbrock was accepted into King Frederick William I of Prussia's retinue in 1729, and was awarded the Order of the Black Eagle in 1739. A member of the so-called "Tobacco Ministry" (Tabakskollegium), Buddenbrock was one of Frederick William's companions when the king was on his deathbed.

In recognition of his leadership in the 1742 Battle of Chotusitz, King Frederick II of Prussia awarded Buddenbrock a diamond-covered portrait of the monarch; the only other recipients of the medallion were Friedrich Wilhelm von Dossow and Hans von Lehwaldt. Frederick also granted Buddenbrock a district captaincy and a pay increment. On 19 March 1745, Buddenbrock was promoted to Generalfeldmarschall.

Buddenbrock died at the age of 85 while Governor of Breslau.

== Children ==
1. Johann Wilhelm Dietrich von Buddenbrock who died in the Battle of Chotusitz,
2. Anna Sophia Agnes von Lehwaldt,
3. Karl Friedrich Frhr. von Buddenbrock,
4. Helene Wilhelmine Freiin von Buddenbrock, #Catharina Luise von Kalnein,
5. Johann Jobst Heinrich von Buddenbrock (1707–1781) was a career army officer who was wounded in the Battle of Hohenfriedberg and later became Generalleutnant and served as governor of the Berlin cadet corps, and 2 others.
