= Friedrich Siegmund von Waldow =

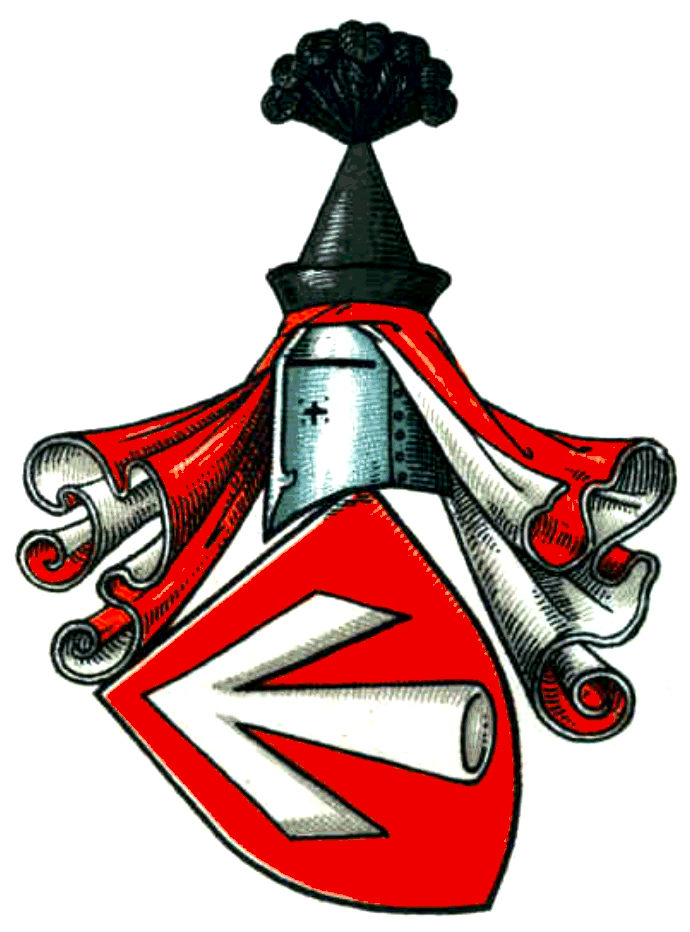
von Waldow arms.

Friedrich Sigmund von Waldow was royal Prussian Major General, Chief of the Cuirassier Regiment no 8 and hereditary lord of Mehrenthin.

Born 1682 in Mehrentin; the son of the Brandenburg Captain Christian Sigismund von Waldow (1650–1707) and Katharina von Sydow (1651–1702). His brother Arnold Christoph von Waldow (1672–1743) was a Prussian general.

== Military career ==
He fought from 1700 for Sweden under Charles XII and participated in the Great Northern War, as well as at the Battle of Poltava. In 1710 he was Major in the Swedish Army.

On 15 November 1715 he moved to become a lieutenant colonel in the Prussian Army, probably campaigning with his older brother. He served first in the Dragoons (Derflinger) and on 1 October 1718 he was appointed commander of a regiment but this lasted only till 26 October 1719.

On 16 July 1724 he became a colonel and at the 1 December 1724 and Waldow was transferred on 26 February 1728 as a commander in the Cuirassiers No. 8. On 15 October 1734 he became chief of the regiment and on 28 March 1737 he was appointed Major General. He fought in the first Silesian War. On 1 July 1742 he was granted leave request, and died a few months later on 5 January 1743.

== Family ==
He was married three times. His first wife was in 1715 Hedwig Katharina von Oppen (18 February 1694 – 28 April 1725); they had several children, including:

- Frederick William (7 February 1717 – 27 May 1762) ∞ 1753 Henriette Louise von der Marwitz (6 March 1730 – 1 November 1806)
- Leopold Wilhelm (3 August 1718 – 6 February 1788)

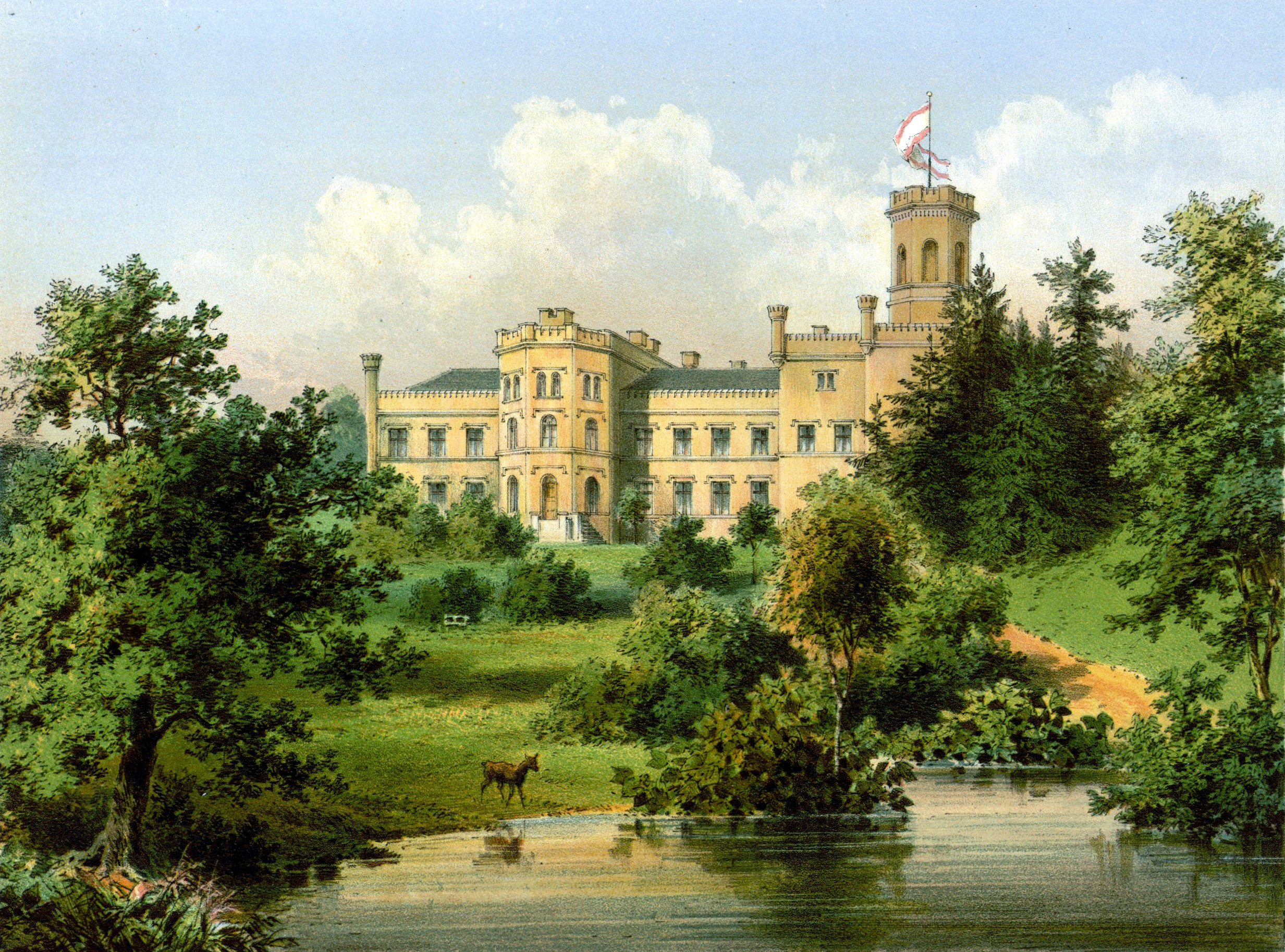
Merenthin Mannor 1860, by Alexander Duncker.

His second marriage in 1715 was to Helene of Guntersberge (died 6 August 1733) and they had the following children:

- Georg (born 1726)
- Christian (born around 1728)
- Dorothee (born 1730)

In 1738 he married Luise Magdalene von Bornstedt (died 18 April 1764). She was the widow of Lieutenant Georg Friedrich (III.) Von Bismarck (1697–1737) and she had a daughter Magarethe Hermine Auguste. Luise was the daughter of Saxon Major General Henry Ehrenreich von Bornstedt and his wife Maria Katharina von Schenck from the house Flechtingen.
