= Chotusice =

Municipality in Central Bohemian Region, Czech Republic

- Municipality
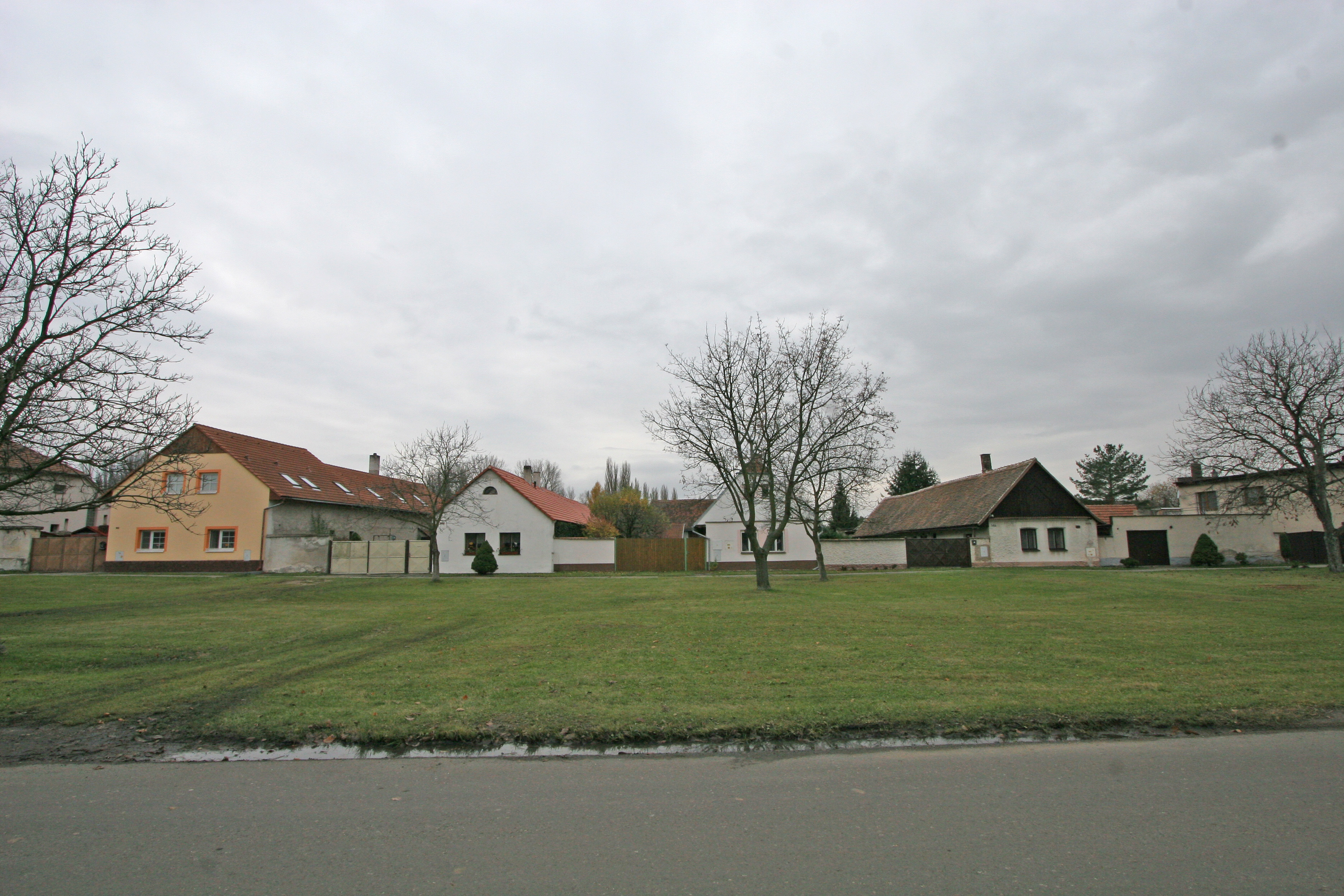
- Centre of Chotusice

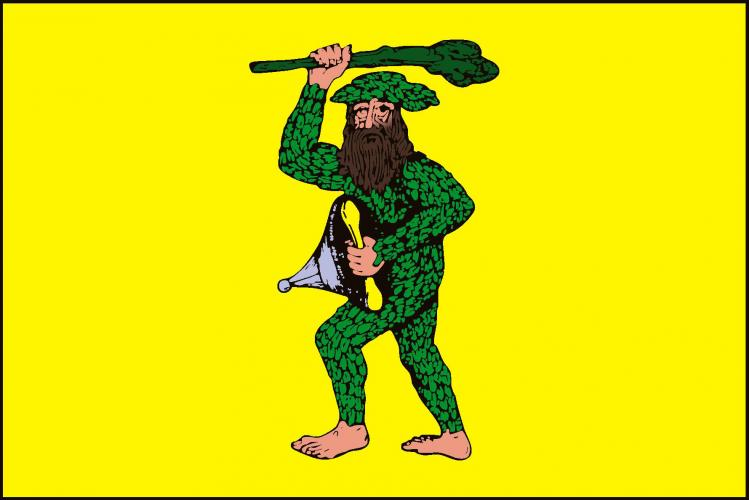
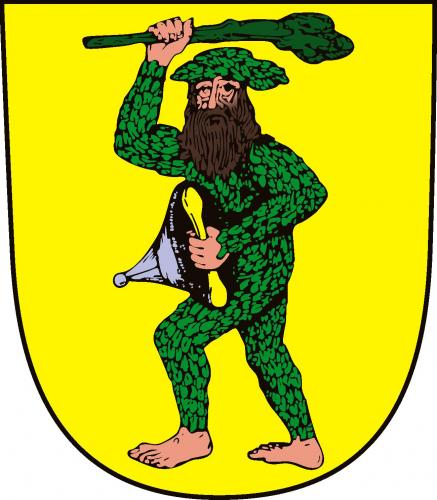
- Flag Coat of arms

- Location in the Czech Republic
- Coordinates: 49°56′57″N 15°23′40″E
- Country: Czech Republic
- Region: Central Bohemian
- District: Kutná Hora
- First mentioned: 1142

Area
  - Total: 7.01 km^{2} (2.71 sq mi)
- Elevation: 224 m (735 ft)

Population (2026-01-01)
  - Total: 821
  - Density: 117/km^{2} (303/sq mi)
- Time zone: UTC+1 (CET)
  - Summer (DST): UTC+2 (CEST)
- Postal codes: 285 76, 286 01
- Website: chotusice.cz

Chotusice is a municipality and village in Kutná Hora District in the Central Bohemian Region of the Czech Republic. It has about 800 inhabitants.

== Administrative division ==
Chotusice consists of two municipal parts (in brackets population according to the 2021 census):

- Chotusice (757)
- Druhanice (4)

== Etymology ==
The initial name of Chotusice was Chotovice. The name was derived from the personal name Chot or Chota, meaning "the village of Chot's/Chota's people". Already in the second half of the 14th century, the village began to be called Chotušice. In the 17th century, the name was distorted to Chotusice.

== Geography ==
Chotusice is located about 8 kilometres (5 mi) east of Kutná Hora and 28 km (17 mi) west of Pardubice. It lies in a flat agricultural landscape in the Central Elbe Table. The Brslenka Stream flows through the municipality.

== History ==
The first written mention of Chotusice is from 1142 under the name Chotovice. In 1316, it was donated to the Sedlec Abbey. Since the second half of the 14th century, the name of Chotusice is used. The village was devastated during the Hussite Wars in 1421, by the army led by Jan Želivský. From 1436, Chotusice was part of the Žehušice estate and shared its owners. The village developed significantly in the 16th century and was promoted to a market town in 1601.

Chotusice is known for the Battle of Chotusitz, which was fought nearby in 1742 as part of the First Silesian War.

== Demographics ==
Historical population

Year	Pop.	±%
1869	1,535	—
1880	1,589	+3.5%
1890	1,423	−10.4%
1900	1,454	+2.2%
1910	1,214	−16.5%

Year	Pop.	±%
1921	1,247	+2.7%
1930	1,250	+0.2%
1950	1,029	−17.7%
1961	1,007	−2.1%
1970	875	−13.1%

Year	Pop.	±%
1980	741	−15.3%
1991	633	−14.6%
2001	650	+2.7%
2011	708	+8.9%
2021	761	+7.5%

Source: Censuses

== Transport ==
There are no railways or major roads passing through the municipality.

== Sights ==
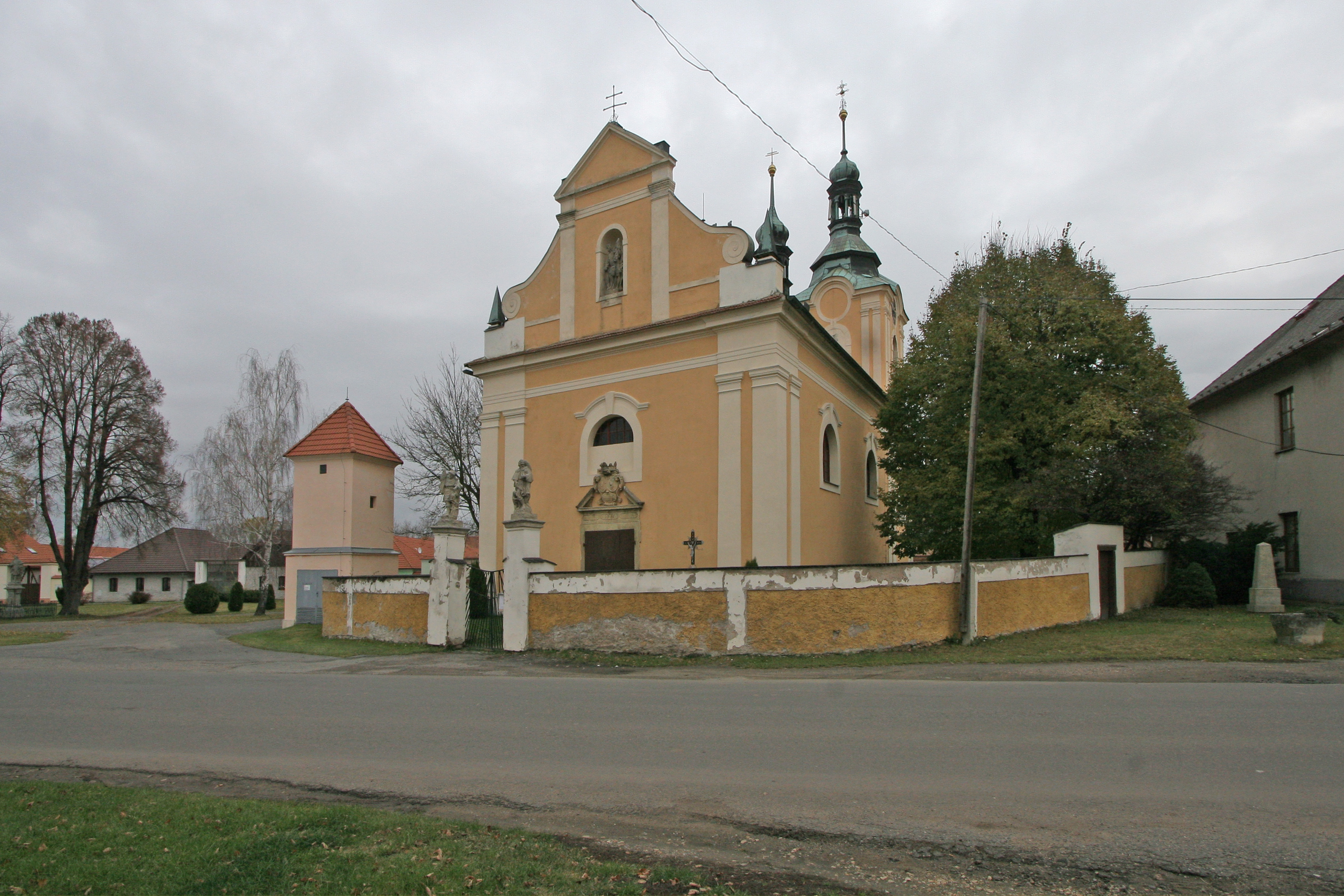
Church of Saint Wenceslaus

The main landmark of Chotusice is the Church of Saint Wenceslaus. It was originally a Gothic church from around 1270, extended in 1716. Then it was reconstructed in the Baroque style in 1742, after it was burned down during the Battle of Chotusitz.
