= Raab Doppelraab =

German two-seat glider, 1951

Doppelraab
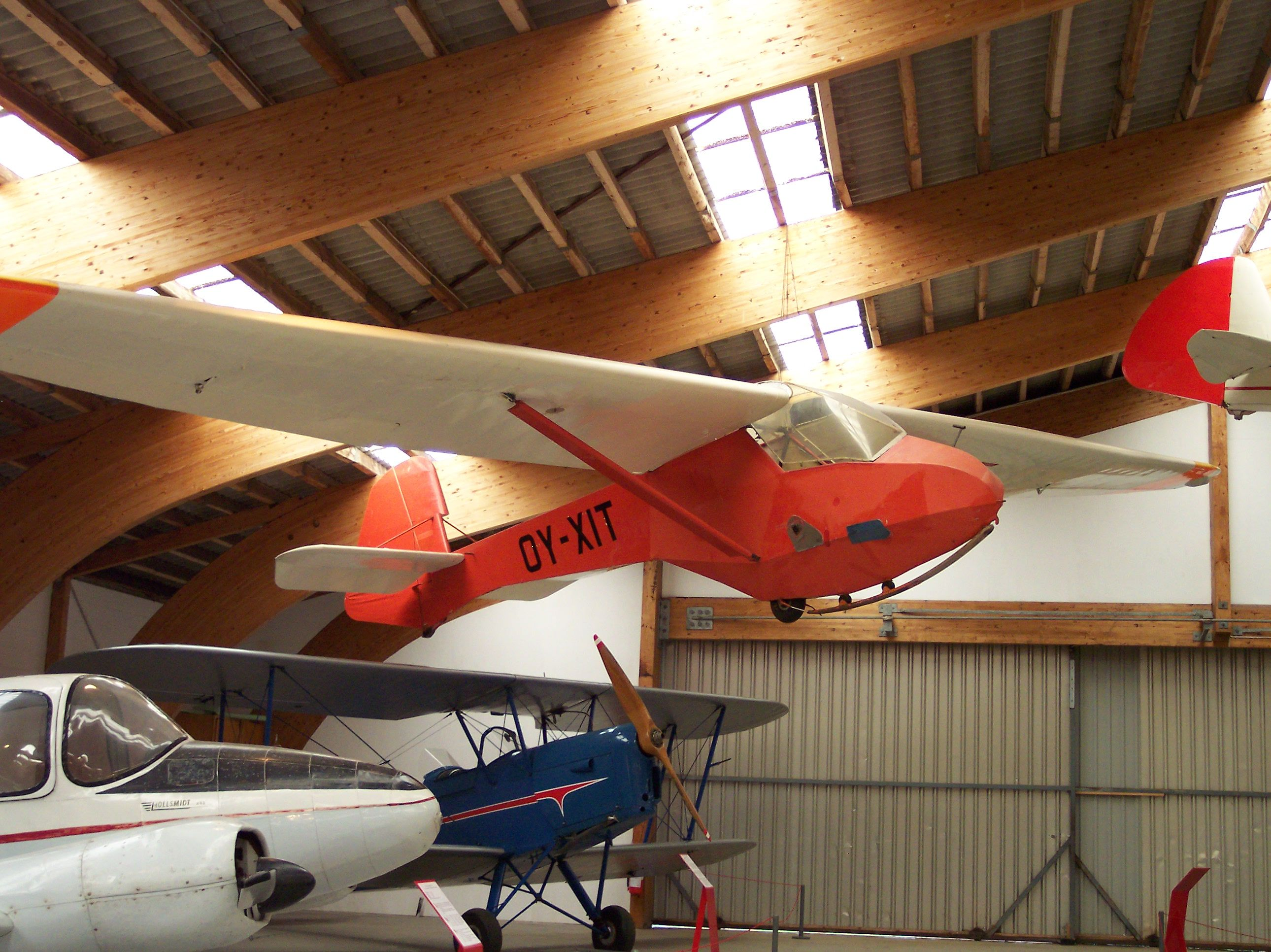
- Doppelraab IV on display at the Danmarks Flymuseum. Stauning

General information
- Type: Two-seat glider
- National origin: Germany
- Designer: Fritz Raab
- Number built: c.360

History
- First flight: 5 August 1951

The Raab Doppelraab is a German training glider produced in the early 1950s which proved popular with gliding clubs. A student pilot was accompanied by an instructor in a small space behind him, sharing the control column and with a dual rudder bar. The Doppelraab could be flown solo for later basic training.

== Design and development ==
Fritz Raab, who had designed gliders before World War II, recognised a postwar need for a low cost trainer aircraft. Rather than reproduce the low-performance, single-seat, open-frame primary gliders of the 1930s, he aimed for a design that could act both as a trainer and as a useful gliding club single-seater with respectable performance. Simplicity of rigging was a priority. The result was the Doppelraab, which some have described as a 1½-seater because of its rudimentary instructor's position. It is a strut-braced high-wing monoplane with a mixed metal-and-wood frame and plywood and fabric covering.

The centre section of the wing has a constant chord, with a plywood-covered D-box forward of the main spar. The ply covering extends to the trailing edge at the wing roots over the triangular area defined by the internal drag strut. The outer panels continue the leading edge ply-covered D-box but incorporate curved ailerons, giving the wing an approximately elliptical planform. Where not ply-surfaced, the wing is fabric-covered. Most production aircraft have mid-chord spoilers on the inner section upper surface. Lift and landing forces are borne by faired struts from the lower fuselage to the main spar close to the end of the wing centre sections.

The Doppelraab has a pod-and-boom style fuselage, though the wood-framed, ply-skinned boom is quite deep and has a triangular section. The fabric-covered, parallel chord horizontal tail, carrying separate elevators, is mounted on top of the fuselage. The fin is narrow and ply covered but mounts a broad, fabric-covered rudder which extends below the bottom of the fuselage, where a small underfin protects it and carries a small tailskid. Forward of the wing trailing edge the fuselage becomes much deeper and is metal framed, forming the cockpit. In the prototype, the student's position was conventional and provided with a windscreen of single curvature and with open sides; the instructor squeezed into a small space behind the student and sat astride a pillion seat in a kneeling position, his weight partly supported by knee pads on either side of the forward seat. He could reach over the pupil to the top of an extended control column and his feet pointed backwards to rest on a duplicate rudder bar. Later production machines retain this layout but have a completely enclosed canopy and a slightly raised, bench type instructor's seat. The early prototypes experimented with both forward monowheel and bicycle undercarriages but the production aircraft settled on a rearward placed monowheel with a long forward skid.

The Doppelraab first flew on 5 August 1951. As well as the early cockpit and undercarriage, the V-0 first prototype had unusual airbrakes, formed by rotating the wing strut fairings through 90°. This system, introduced to expedite rigging, was found unsatisfactory and was abandoned in favour of spoilers. The second prototype, the V-1, initially had a two-wheel undercarriage, later altered by the replacement of the front wheel by an extended noseskid (V-1a). The V-2 and V-3 introduced the rear bench seat. The V-3 acted as the prototype for the first production version, the Doppelraab III, though only a few of them were built. The most numerous variant was the Doppelraab IV. Though detail improvements were introduced in the Doppelraab V, no major changes came before the final versions VI and VII. These had wings of 640 mm (25.2 in) greater span and correspondingly increased wing area. The empty weight of the version VI was increased by only 7 kg (15.4 b) but by flying with a higher wing loading this model could provide a 25 kg (55 lb) increase in useful load.

== Operational history ==
The Doppelraab appeared in public for the first time at the first postwar Wasserkuppe competition, held in 1951. It was enthusiastically received, Hanna Reitsch saying that it was "a dream of an aircraft". Its thermal soaring was judged competitive with the Grunau Baby. After a year twelve were flying with fifty in production; final production was close to four hundred. Serial production was handled by Wolf Hirth; both kits and finished aircraft were available. The forward fuselage frame was factory welded in either case. After gaining experience with his instructor, a pupil could fly the Doppelraab solo to gain his early badges, minimising the club's costs.

Production licences were granted in both Americas, Africa and the Near East; one Doppelraab flew as far north as Spitsbergen.

In 2010 twenty-two Doppelraabs remained on the civil aircraft registers of European countries, one in Belgium, one in the Netherlands, one in Spain and the rest in Germany.

== Variants ==
Data from Die berümtesten Segelflugzeuge

Prototypes
V-0
First Doppelraab. Single wheel plus skid undercarriage. First flown 5 August 1951.
V-1
Second landing wheel added in tandem, behind first. First flown 28 March 1952. V-1a had rearward extended skid in place of forward wheel.
V-2
Built by Wolf Hirth using high grade steel tubes around the cabin; approved for commercial construction only. Fitted with a rear seat rather than a pillion. V-1a type undercarriage.
Doppelraab III (prototype V-3)
As V-2; small numbers produced.
Doppelraab IV (prototype V-4)
Cabin structure of more easily welded normal steel, approved for amateur construction. Revised canopy. Chief production model.
Doppelraab V (prototype V-5)
Similar to V-3 but with integrated spoilers which were standard on subsequent aircraft. Production model.
Doppelraab VI
Span increased to 13.40 m (43 ft 11½ in). Production model.
Doppelraab VII
Span as model VI.Production model.

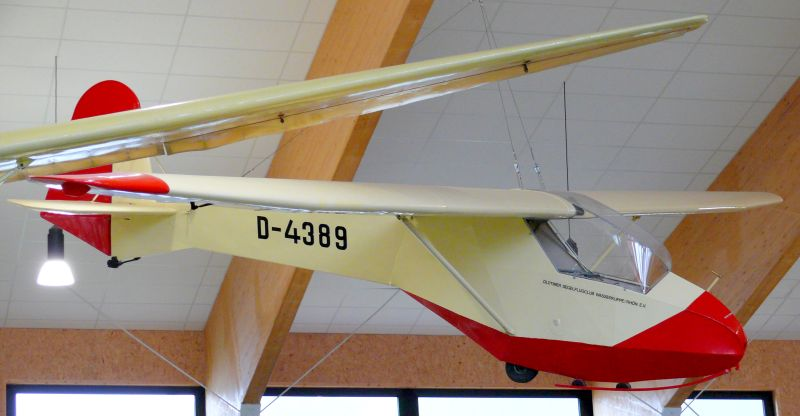
Doppelraab V at the Deutsches Segelflug Museum, Wasserkuppe (not on public display in 2009)

Pützer Motoraab
aka MoRaab, a production conversion to motorglider
Rohn Doppelraab IV
One of several different motorglider conversions with tricycle undercarriage.

== Aircraft on display ==
Data from Ogden, 2009 All are model IVs and are on public display.

- OE-0333: Aviaticum, Wiener Neustadt
- OY-XIT: Danmarks Flymuseum, Stauning Vestjylland Airport, Skjern
- D-1220: Deutsches Museum Flugwerft Schleissheim, Oberschleissheim
- D-5374: Sinsheim Auto & Technik Museum, Sinsheim
- D-8572: Flugausstellung Peter Junior, Hermeskeil

== Specifications (models I-IV ) ==
Data from Die berümtesten Segelflugzeuge

General characteristics

- Crew: two
- Length: 6.90 m (22 ft 8 in)
- Wingspan: 12.76 m (41 ft 10 in)
- Wing area: 18.0 m^{2} (194 sq ft)
- Aspect ratio: 9.74
- Empty weight: 185 kg (408 lb)
- Gross weight: 380 kg (838 lb)

Performance

- Maximum speed: 190 km/h (120 mph, 100 kn)
- Minimum control speed: 50 km/h (31 mph, 27 kn)
- Maximum glide ratio: 20
- Rate of sink: 0.24 m/s (47 ft/min)
- Wing loading: 22.6 kg/m^{2} (4.6 lb/sq ft)
