= Ujjain Engineering College =

Engineering College

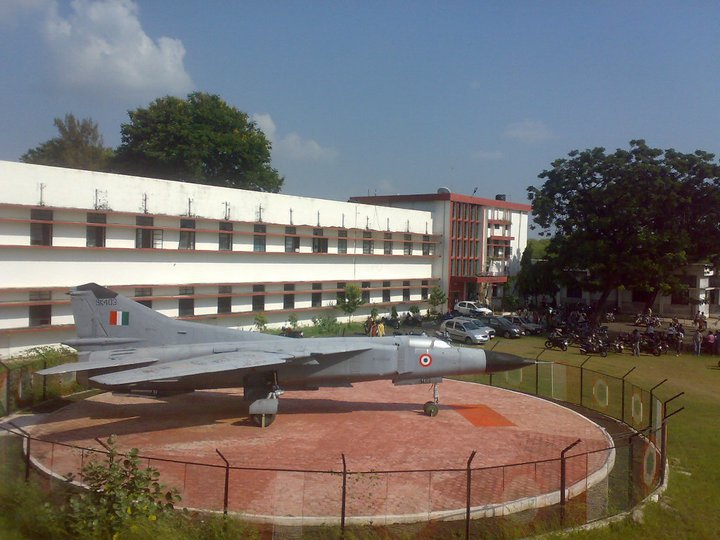
- Former name: Government Engineering College
- Type: Public
- Established: 1966
- Affiliations: Vikram University
- Students: 1246
- Location: Ujjain, Madhya Pradesh, India; 23.1461°N 75.7955°E
- Website: www.uecu.ac.in

Ujjain Engineering College is an engineering college in Ujjain city, in the state of Madhya Pradesh, India. The college was established by the government of Madhya Pradesh in 1966.

== History ==
The college was founded as Government Engineering College, Ujjain, in 1966 by the government of Madhya Pradesh, with a view to improve technical education. The college was declared autonomous by the state government in 1997. Under this arrangement, the college is governed by a governing body, whose chairman is the minister of the Manpower Planning Department of the state government, and the secretary is the college's principal. The college is recognized by the All India Council of Technical Education.

== Campus ==
The college's campus covers nearly 300 acres of land situated at Indore Road.

== Courses ==
Initially, there were only three branches of engineering: civil engineering, mechanical engineering, and electrical engineering. Later on, electronics engineering (1985) and chemical engineering (1986) branches were introduced. A Bachelor of Engineering in computer science and engineering course was commenced in the 2001-2002 year. The college has post-graduate programs in engineering in various streams, including an Electronics and Communication course that commenced in 2012. The college is also a research center for Doctorate programs in various engineering fields.

== Events ==
Festivals include:

- Technical Events festival
- Mech Tech Meet (MTM): The institute's annual technical festival, first held on 6 March 2010.

Cultural and social events include:

- Aayam: A college annual function organized within college premises.
- Xception: A college cultural and social festival, organized by the students, with online and offline events.

== Diamond Jubilee Celebrations ==
The college started in 1966, which marks 2026 as the Diamond Jubilee year. A 3-day celebration is planned by the administration on 18th, 19th and 20th December 2026.

== Engineer's Pledge ==
On 15 September 2026 (Engineers' Day), the principal, Dr. Umesh Pendharkar, released the "Engineer's Pledge for 21st Century". The pledge is authored by Puneet Bhatnagar and Prasad Dange, with art direction by Sanjay Khimesara. It was formulated based on insights gathered from interactions with over 100 speakers from "GECU Samvad", an alumni-led knowledge-sharing webinar series.

The pledge states:

I am a 21st-century engineer.

I pledge to uphold the highest standards of professional conduct and integrity in everything I do, always placing safety, security, and human dignity above all else.

I will always be aware that every technology, system, product, structure, and process I design, build, or operate affects human well-being and the planet.

I will embrace innovation, solution-focused thinking, and empathy as my guiding principles to enhance efficiency, productivity and create sustainable value for society.

In a world of perpetual change, I will continue to learn, adapt, and improve. I will share my knowledge and expertise with others to build a better tomorrow.

My mantra is: Fast, steady, and responsible!

=== Clubs ===
Litoffer is a literature and personality development club that started in September 2015 and encourages students to improve their skills in public speaking and writing. It conducts debates, group discussions, extempore speaking, and academic events.
