= Military history of Austria =

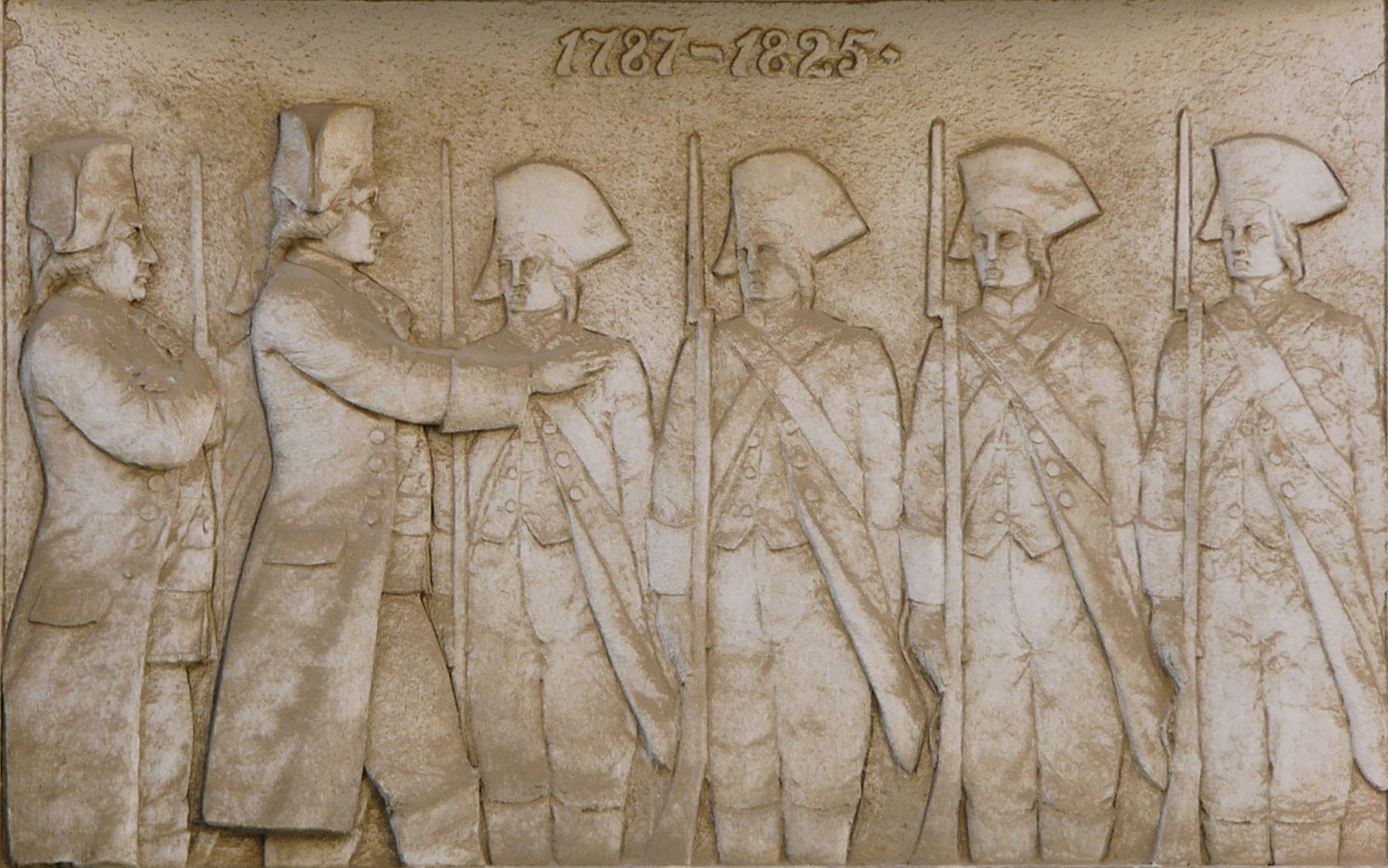
Austrian Infantry

The Austrian Empire and its predecessor, the Archduchy of Austria, was one of the most prevalent states in Europe throughout its history. The following is Austria's military history from the 18th century.

== 18th Century ==
After a series of impressive victories in the Great Turkish War, Austria found itself at war with France again along the Grand Alliance. Still, Austria and its allies managed to win impressive victories like Turin and Blenheim, plus the Austrians successfully crushed uprisings in Hungary and Bavaria. However, the French victory at Denain secured the Bourbon throne in Spain. Still, the Austrians fought well and enjoyed great territorial gains in the Treaty of Rastatt.

In 1716 the Ottomans once again invaded Austria, but the military genius Prince Eugene of Savoy outmatched them in the battles of Petrovaradin and Belgrade, expanding Austria to its greatest territorial extent. Meanwhile, the Spanish wanted to recapture their lost territories, but Austria and its allies stopped them.

In the 1730s the skill of Austrian soldiers & generals would temporarily decline. Crushing defeats against the French and Ottomans at Guastalla & Grocka caused the Austrians to lose most of their previously gained territories.

Worse, in 1740 Prussia invaded Silesia to become a great power. Austria's defeat against a tiny country convinced many other countries to finally partition it. Prussia, France, Spain, Bavaria, Saxony, Naples, Sardinia and Modena then created an alliance to finally wipe out Austria from the European map. At first, the invasion of Austria went well: The Franco-Bavarian armies quickly invaded Upper Austria and then took Bohemia along with Saxony. Meanwhile, Maria Theresa called the Hungarians for her help and appointed Ludwig Andreas von Khevenhüller as commander-in-chief. Despite not getting help from Britain, Russia and the Netherlands or the promised 60,000 Hungarian troops (only 1/3 of them were ready for combat) yet, Khevenhüller was able to launch a massive offensive that annihilated huge parts of the Franco-Bavarian armies (alone in Linz 10,000 French surrendered). Munich was taken. However, Prussia was still able to take Silesia and leave the war. Meanwhile, Modena was occupied, Sardinia switched sides, and Spain & Naples were unable to control entire North Italy thanks to Otto Ferdinand von Abensperg und Traun. Saxony switched sides as well in 1743. In 1744 Frederick the Great even tried to conquer Bohemia, but Austro-Saxon forces harassed his supply lines and forced him to retreat. His victory at Hohenfriedberg however allowed him to keep Silesia, despite the decisive Bavarian defeat. The war ended in 1748.

Maria Theresa then began massive military reforms. When the Seven Years' War started, Prussia enjoyed initial success by conquering Saxony and Prague. However, the Austrians took advantage of their poor performance and defeated the Prussians at Kolín & Hochkirch. After Kunersdorf the Prussians were so close to defeat that only the Miracle of the House of Brandenburg saved them from certain destruction. In a last-ditch effort, Prussia beat Austria at Torgau and so the war became an inconclusive stalemate, which was arguably still more satisfactory for Prussia.

After that, Austria didn't see so many military actions. It joined the Polish partitions, fought another inconclusive struggle against Prussia, and beat the Ottomans along with Russia in the Austro-Turkish War.

== French Revolutionary & Napoleonic Wars ==
Austria entered the French Revolutionary Wars with a rough start after France had declared war on Austria. Although Austria was successfully able to defend the German territories, the young Napoleon Bonaparte crushed the Austrians in North Italy. The 2nd Coalition War went no better, with humiliating defeats at Marengo and Hohenlinden taking place.

The Napoleonic Wars greatly became unpopular in Austria, but Britain constantly convinced Austria to join it. When Austria finally joined in 1805, its army capitulated at Ulm and was together defeated with the Russians at Austerlitz. Francis I's brother Archduke Charles basically then tried to make reforms to make the Austrian army more effective. Although not completed yet, the Austrians, after some early setbacks inflicted Napoleon's first major defeat at Aspern-Essling. However, Napoleon was still able to defeat Archduke Charles at Wagram and force him to sue for peace despite the heavy French casualties. Austria then practiced in the French invasion of Russia with no significant fighting, but after the French disaster finally rejoined the Coalition again. The Austrians took part in the German & Italian campaigns and forced Napoleon to surrender along the other great powers. Austria played a decisive role in dethroning Murat after beating him at Tolentino. Napoleon's fate was finally sealed at Waterloo.

== Post-Napoleonic Wars to World War I ==
Austria enjoyed a quite peaceful period from 1816 and 1847. It only put down some minor rebellions and naval expeditions in Morocco and Egypt. Austrian admiral Archduke Friedrich led the Anglo-Austrian-Ottoman troops ahead of all others against the Bergcastell and by 6 o'clock in the afternoon Sidon was taken. 1,500 men of the crew were taken prisoner. Following the bombardment of Acre on 3-4 November 1840, he then decided to attack the citadel that night and personally led a small landing party of Austrian, British, and Ottoman troops and took the citadel of Acre after the Egyptian garrison had fled. They hoisted the Ottoman, British and Austrian flags over the citadel.

In 1848 Austria faced two dangerous revolutions and the army was once needed again. While Joseph Radetzky von Radetz beat the Italians at Custoza and Novara, Austrian commanders in Hungary needed Russian help.

The revolutions significantly weakened Austria, plus it became isolated after the Crimean War in order to avoid another Hungarian revolution. Sardinia then successfully provoked Austria to declare war on them, resulting in France intervening and decisively defeating Austria at Solferino.

Then Austria joined the Second Schleswig War to defeat Denmark. While Prussia suffered initial defeats against tiny Denmark at Mysunde and Jasmund, Austria on the other hand beat them at Königshügel, Sankelmark, Vejle and Heligoland. However, Prussia managed to secure a decisive victory against Denmark at Dybbøl.

Still, Austria & Prussia quickly broke their alliance and fought against each other for German leadership. Due to superior Prussian leadership, better-trained troops, a more developed economy, faster railways, and faster rifles, the Prussians decisively won at Königgrätz. Although Austria was successful against Italy, they were unable to stop the Prussian advance. This war not only caused Austria to lose German leadership, but it was also the beginning of Austria's permanent military decline.

From 1867 to 1918, the Austro-Hungarian Army was the ground force of the Austro-Hungarian Empire. It was composed of the common army (recruited from anywhere), the Austrian Landwehr (recruited only from Cisleithania), and the Hungarian Honvéd (recruited only from Transleithania).

These are official names in German:

- Regiments of the common army were "Imperial and Royal" - kaiserlich und königlich (k.u.k.)
- The Austrian Landwehr regiments were "Imperial Royal" - kaiserlich-königlich (k.k.).
- The Hungarian Honvéd regiments were "Royal Hungarian" - königlich ungarisch (k.u.)

The Austro-Hungarian Navy was the naval force of the Austro-Hungarian Empire. Its official name in German was the Kaiserlich und königliche Kriegsmarine ("Imperial and Royal Navy", also known by the acronym k.u.k.).

This army existed from the establishment of the Dual Monarchy in 1867 until the end of World War I in 1918. The army first saw action in the Austro-Hungarian campaign in Bosnia and Herzegovina in 1878 and Boxer Rebellion.

== World War I ==
In 1914 Archduke Franz Ferdinand was assassinated by a Serbo-Bosnian student named Gavrilo Princip. The Austro-Hungarian military leader Conrad von Hötzendorf saw it finally as a chance to attack Serbia. When Serbia failed to accept all ultimatum terms, Austria-Hungary struck.

Serbian Front: Although Austria-Hungary had slightly more troops and significant technological advances, the Serbs had more experienced generals and highly motivated troops. The whole Serbian campaign ended in failure for Austria-Hungary and German & Bulgarian help was required in 1915. However, Austria-Hungary successfully took Montenegro in 1916.

Despite early victories at Kraśnik & Komarów, the Austro-Hungarians quickly lost the entirety of Galicia. With German help, the Russians were repelled in from most of the region. However, the Brusilov offensive utterly mauled the Austro-Hungarian army, becoming completely dependent on the Germans for the rest of the war.

Italian Front: This was probably the only front where the Austro-Hungarians were partially effective by holding back multiple Isonzo offensives for over 2 years. In 1917 Austro-German forces finally broke the stalemate at Caporetto until they were stopped at the Piave River. The Danube Monarchy finally collapsed at Vittorio Veneto.

== After World War I ==
Between 1918 and 1921, the military forces were known as Volkswehr (people's defense).

From 1921 to the present (except World War II, (1938–1945)), the name of the military of Austria is Bundesheer ("Federal Army"). The branches are Land Forces (KdoLdSK) and Air Forces (KdoLuSK).

In 1955, Austria declared its neutrality and made neutrality a constitutional law. The main purpose of the Austrian military, since then, has been the protection of Austria's neutrality.

== See also ==
- Austria–NATO relations
- Military of Austria-Hungary
- Imperial and Royal Army during the Napoleonic Wars
- Austro-Hungarian Navy
