= Asprey (surname) =

Asprey is a surname of British origin. Notable people with the surname include:

- Alistair Asprey (born 1944), British politician and former Hong Kong government official
- Bill Asprey (1936–2025), English football player and manager
- Charles Asprey (1813–1892), English cricketer
- Dave Asprey (born 1973), American entrepreneur and author
- George Asprey (born 1966), British stage actor
- Kenneth Asprey (1905–1993), Australian judge
- Larned B. Asprey (1919–2005), American chemist
- Robert B. Asprey (1923–2009), American military historian and author
- Winifred Asprey (1917–2007), American mathematician and computer scientist
