= Austro-Hungarian Armed Forces =

Military forces of Austria-Hungary (1867–1918)

- Bewaffnete Macht (German); Fegyveres Erő (Hungarian)
- Standard of the Supreme Commander in Chief, the Emperor of Austria, King of Hungary
- Founded: 5 March 1867; 159 years ago
- Disbanded: December 3, 1918; 107 years ago
- Service branches: Austro-Hungarian Army; Austro-Hungarian Navy; Austro-Hungarian Aviation Troops
- Headquarters: Vienna

Leadership
- Supreme Commander: Hermann Kövess von Kövessháza (last)
- Minister of War: Rudolf Stöger-Steiner von Steinstätten (last)
- Chief of the General Staff: Arthur Arz von Straußenburg (last)

Personnel
- Military age: 17 years of age
- Active personnel: 2,500,000 (1914)
- Deployed personnel: 7,800,000 (1914–1918)

Industry
- Domestic suppliers: (Austria-Hungary) Skoda (Austria-Hungary) Steyr Mannlicher (Austria-Hungary) Rast & Gasser (Austria-Hungary) Fegyver- és Gépgyár
- Foreign suppliers: (German Empire) Mauser (Danish Realm) Dansk Rekyl Riffel Syndikat

Related articles
- History: Austrian Empire; Austrian Army; Military history of Austria; Imperial and Royal Army during the Napoleonic Wars
- Ranks: Army ranks; Navy ranks

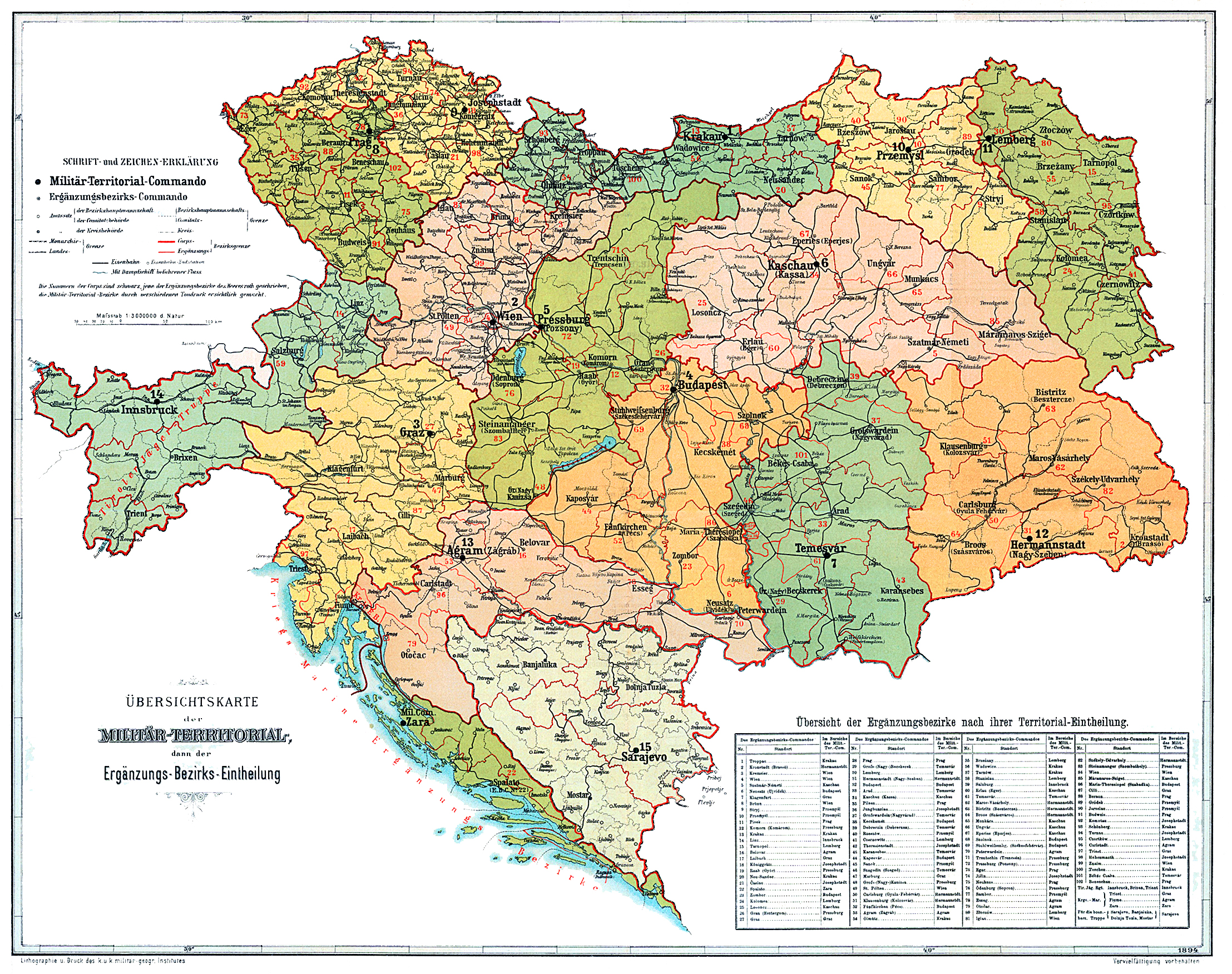
The Corps of Austria-Hungary in 1894 (in German)

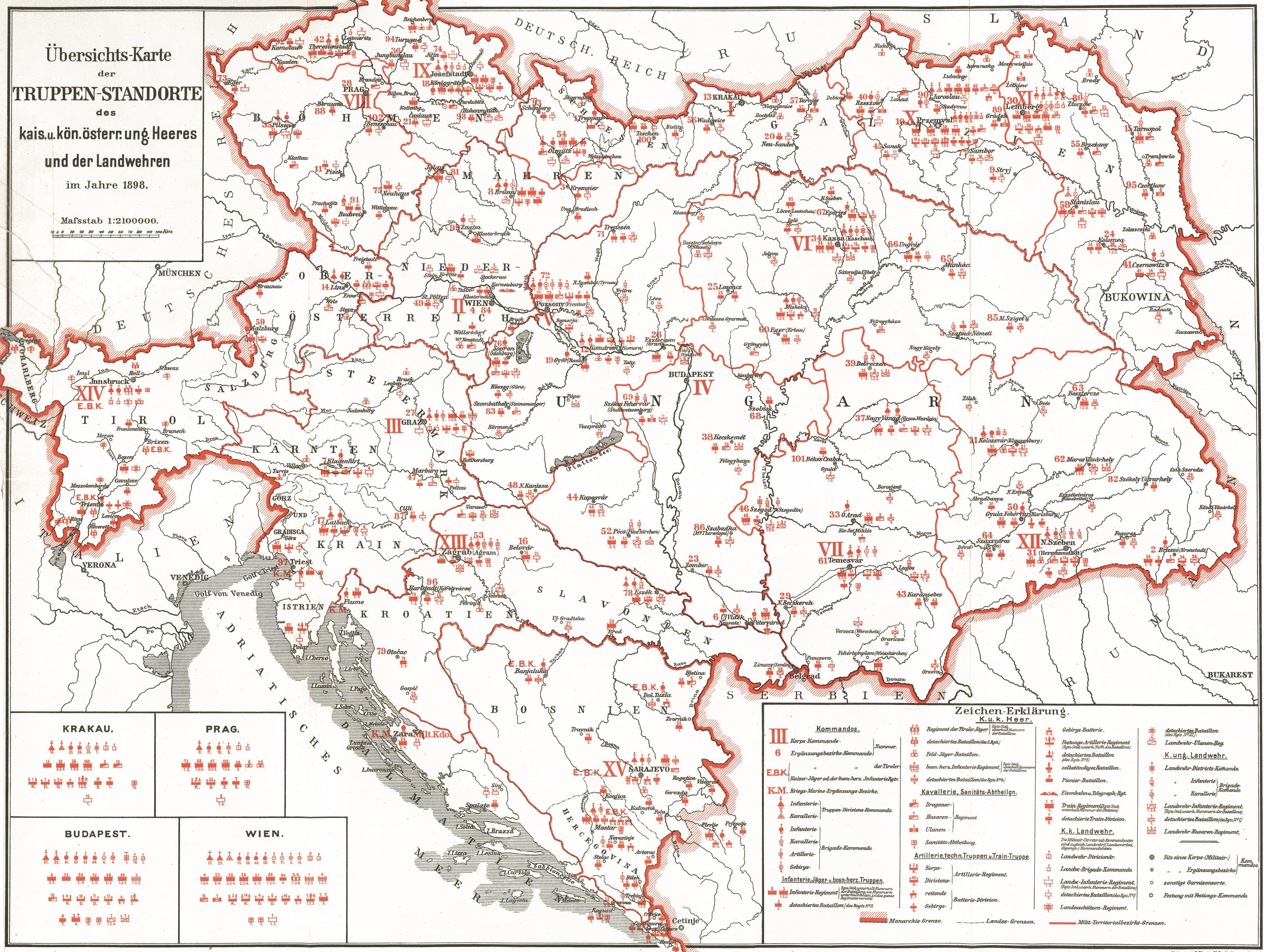
The 16 Military Districts of Austria-Hungary in 1898 (in German)

Arms of the Habsburg Dynasty

The Cross Pattee

Merchant and naval ensign: 1786 (1869)–1918

The Austro-Hungarian Armed Forces (German: Bewaffnete Macht or Wehrmacht; Hungarian: Fegyveres Erő) or Imperial and Royal Armed Forces were the military forces of Austria-Hungary. It comprised two main branches: The Army (Landstreitkräfte) and the Navy (Kriegsmarine). Both of them organised their own aviation branches – the Army's Aviation Troops (K.u.K. Luftfahrtruppen) and the Navy's Naval Aviation (K.u.K. Seefliegerkorps). The Army in turn consisted of its own three branches: The Common Army (Gemeinsame Armee), the Imperial-Royal Landwehr (kaiserlich-königliche Landwehr) and the Royal Hungarian Honvéd (königlich ungarische Landwehr).

The Supreme Commander of the Armed Forces was the Emperor-King, the professional leader was the Chief of the General Staff and the head of the joint Ministry for military affairs was the Minister of War.

The Armed Forces served as one of the Empire's core unifying institutions and the principal instrument for the national defense as well as external power projection. The history of the Austro-Hungarian military begins when the Habsburgs established hereditary rule over Austrian lands in the 13th century and stretches until the fall of the Habsburgs, at the end of World War I, during which time their armies were among the largest and most significant in Europe. Though not as powerful as some of its contemporaries, the military of Austria-Hungary's scale, resources, organization, technology and training were one of the central factors determining conferral of 'great power' status on the empire for much of the 19th and early 20th centuries.

== Administration and organization ==
The Military of Austria-Hungary was divided primarily into two primary services. They fell within the ultimate remit of the Minister for War:

- Austro-Hungarian Army
- Austro-Hungarian Navy
- Austro-Hungarian Aviation Troops

The war ministry itself served as one of the few 'common' ministries with jurisdiction throughout the Empire and over which the Imperial, as opposed to Austrian or Hungarian governments had local control. Command over large 'home' forces – the Landwehr units, which served functions analogous to National Guard forces in the United States were however controlled by local Ministries of Defence in both Austria and Hungary. Within the War Ministry, the Navy enjoyed considerable autonomy through the Naval Section with its own staff and headquarters, while the Ministry itself concentrated more on quarter master and administrative functions that close operational control of its respective services.

While nominal, the umbrella organisation managing the Empire's Military capabilities, the War Ministry was not responsible for not only large state militia forces during peacetime but also an array of organisations such as the Evidenzbureau, whose remit fell within the Ministry of Foreign Affairs. The organisation of units and forces among a plethora of different commands and bodies had the effect of instilling a number of organisational cultures, diffusing responsibility, creating competition between agencies, failing to develop inter-organisational efficiencies and meaning that no one body had overall control of all military forces below the Emperor in preparing for war.

Below the Minister for War, separate staffs and commanders-in-chief oversaw the training, planning, and operations responsibilities of their respective service branches. In terms of the Army, by 1914 it was divided among 16 Military Districts and comprising 325,000 active troops at all levels as well as 40,000 Austrian Landwehr and 30,000 troops of the Hungarian Honved.

The Austro-Hungarian Navy maintained a number of naval facilities in the Adriatic, most importantly that at Pola, and possessed some three modern dreadnought class battleships in 1914 as well as three modern pre-dreadnoughts and nine older battleships and a range of other craft including cruisers, destroyers and submarines in various states of combat readiness.

The Austro-Hungarian air force remained embryonic in 1914 with a few German built planes having been added to the Army balloon service in 1913, but was to see marked expansion during the early years of the war.

== History and operations ==
=== Origins ===
The Austro-Hungarian military was a direct descendant of the military forces of the Habsburg sections Holy Roman Empire from the 13th century and the successor state that was the Austrian Empire from 1804. For 200 years, Habsburg or Austrian forces had formed a main opposing military force to a repeated Ottoman campaigns in Europe, with the Ottoman forces being stopped in battles around Vienna, which was besieged twice, in 1529 and again in 1683. Count Ernst Rüdiger von Starhemberg, commanding troops in the city, broke the siege in 1683 with the aid of German and Polish forces under the King of Poland, Jan Sobieski, and pushed the besieging Ottoman armies toward the Balkans, ending its further engagements in Central Europe.

Prince Eugene of Savoy, after a brief raid into Ottoman-held Bosnia, culminating in the sack of Sarajevo in 1697, returned to Vienna in November to a triumphal reception. In coordination with the Duke of Marlborough, Savoyard prince won a series of victories over Louis XIV in the War of the Spanish Succession (1701–14). Wars fought with the Prussia of Frederick the Great over Silesia in 1740–48 (the War of the Austrian Succession) and 1756–63 were less successful, although Austria still could keep up as contesting power and did not get partitioned like Poland in 1795 nor suffered major losses like France in 1763. The monarchy's military potential during the eighteenth century was limited by the emperor's dependence on provincial Diets for recruits and tax receipts while the nobles of the imperial lands who controlled the enserfed peasantry had no fixed obligation to provide soldiers to the Habsburg.

Austria was prominent in the coalitions that tried to contain Napoleon but was defeated in 1800, again in 1805 when Napoleon occupied Vienna after the Battle of Austerlitz, and finally after the bloody Battle of Wagram in 1809, despite inflicting Napoleon's first major defeat at Aspern-Essling. Austria still joined the final campaign resulting in Napoleon's defeat in 1814. One year later Austria crushed the pro-Napoleonic Kingdom of Naples in the Neapolitan War.

From 1815 to 1848 Austria experienced a rather peaceful era, only launching two successful naval expeditions (Austrian expedition against Morocco (1829) and Oriental Crisis of 1840), and putting down minor rebellions.

Armies displayed their loyalty to the monarchy in 1848 and 1849, suppressing the revolutionary regimes that had swept into power in Vienna, Budapest, Milan, and Prague. In 1859 Austria was provoked into war with Piedmont and its supporter, the France of Napoleon III. The Austro-Piedmontese War lasted only three months, but both sides mobilized large armies. The Austrians were defeated after bitter fighting at Magenta and Solferino, the young Emperor Franz Joseph assuming personal command during the Battle of Solferino.

The following Second Schleswig War with Prussia against Denmark was more successful, winning the battles of Königshügel, Sankelmark and Vejle, thus breaking the Danish blockade. However, Prussia established its domination over other German states by its victory over Austria in the Seven Weeks' War in 1866. The critical battle was waged at Königgrätz (Hradec Králové in the present-day Czech Republic). The Austrians armed with muzzle-loading rifles sustained 20,000 casualties and 20,000 prisoners. The battle overshadowed Austria's victories over Prussia's Italian allies at Custoza and in the naval Battle of Lissa (Vis) off the Dalmatian coast in which a smaller Austrian fleet of ironclads overcame the Italians by ramming them. Following the end of the Seven Weeks' War, Austria experienced fifty years of peace until World War I broke out in 1914.

=== 1867–1914 ===
The creation of Austria-Hungary under the Compromise (Ausgleich) of 1867 separated the Empire into independent Austrian and Hungarian governments. Only the army, foreign affairs, and related budgetary matters remained with the emperor, who held supreme command of all forces in time of war. A new army law decreed universal three-year conscription followed by a ten-year reserve obligation. In practice, only about one in five of those liable to service were called up, and many were sent on leave after two years. The army of Austria-Hungary has been described as a state within a state. In an empire of ten nationalities and five religions, marked by ethnic conflict and sharp political and economic divisions, the army formed the only real bond among the emperor's subjects and the sole instrument through which loyalty to him could find expression.

Nevertheless, Austria-Hungary gave the impression of being a highly militarized nation. According to British historian Edward Crankshaw who noted that not only the emperor but most males in high society never wore civilian clothes except when hunting. Select regiments of the army were splendidly outfitted, but, with a few dedicated exceptions, the officers, so magnificent on the parade ground, "shrank ... from the arbitrament of arms as from an unholy abyss". In reality, Austro-Hungarian military spending remained the lowest among the Great Powers. More of its GDP went to wine, beer and tobacco than to the armed forces.

Regiments were organized along linguistic lines, although German was the language of command. Ethnic factors did not prevent recruitment of non-German speakers to the officer corps or their regular promotion. Hungarians, Croats, Serbs, Poles, Italians, Czechs, Slovenes, and Romanians could be found in senior positions. In the more prestigious units, most field-grade officers owed their ranks to birth or wealth. In 1900, a majority of the officer corps in the Austro-Hungarian army were native German speakers, although only one-fourth of the empire's total population was German speaking.

During the late 19th and early 20th century leading up to World War One, the Austro-Hungarian Military underwent a process of modernisation in all service branches in terms of training, equipment and doctrine, although many traditions and old practices remained in force. As a result of the efforts chief-of-staff Montecuccoli and heir to the throne Franz Ferdinand the navy underwent considerable modernisation with the commission of a number of new units, and specifically three up-to-date battleships delivered by 1914. The army too underwent gradual and constant modernisation but maintained an unhealthy commitment to fortress-warfare as evidenced by concentration on giant artillery pieces and fortification building along the empire's eastern frontier. Although sometimes dismissed as fanciful and lacking touch with the realities confronting the forces at his disposal, as a chief of General Staff Conrad had ensured the army had remained vigilant and planning for war was at an advanced stage by 1914, although it has been argued that reorganisation and redeployment should have been sweeping in the aftermath of the Redl affair.

During the period of 1867–1914, Austro-Hungarian forces were stationed on a number of national and international assignments. Although the empire exhibited no colonial aspirations, forays abroad including the military occupation of Bosnia and Herzegovina, the Novi Pazar, the expedition to Crete and involvement in the Boxer Rebellion.

=== 1914–1918 ===
At the start of the war, the army was divided in two, the smaller part attacked Serbia while the larger part fought against the massive Russian army. The 1914 invasion of Serbia was a disaster. By the end of the year the Austro-Hungarian Army had taken no territory and had lost 227,000 men (out of a total force of 450,000 men); see Serbian Campaign (World War I).

On the Eastern front, things started out equally badly. The Austro-Hungarian Army was defeated at the Battle of Lemberg and the mighty fort city of Przemysl was besieged (it would fall in March 1915).

In May 1915, Italy joined the Allies and attacked Austria-Hungary. The bloody fighting on the Italian front would last for the next three and a half years, ending with a decisive defeat of the Habsburg forces and leading to the collapse of the empire. The Austrians often proved effective in this front, managing to hold back the numerically superior Italian armies in the Alps thanks to superior artillery and terrain advantage.

In the summer, the Austro-Hungarian Army, working under a unified command with the Germans, participated in the successful Gorlice–Tarnow Offensive.

Later in 1915, the Austro-Hungarian Army, in conjunction with the German and Bulgarian armies, conquered Serbia.

In 1916, the Russians focused their attacks on the Austro-Hungarian Army in the Brusilov Offensive, recognizing the numerical inferiority of the Austro-Hungarian Army. The Austrian armies took massive losses (losing about 600,000 men) and never recovered. The huge losses of men and material inflicted on the Russians during the offensive contributed greatly to the causes of their Communist revolution of 1917. The Austro-Hungarian war effort became more and more subordinate to the direction of German planners, as it did with the standard soldiers. The Austrians saw the German army positively, but by 1916 the general belief in Germany was that they were "shackled to a corpse". Supply shortages, low morale, and the high casualty rate seriously affected the operational abilities of the army, as well as the fact the army was of multiple ethnicity, all with different race, language and customs.

The last two successes for the Austrians: the Conquest of Romania and the Caporetto Offensive, were German-assisted operations. Due to the fact that the empire had become more and more dependent on German assistance, the majority of its people, not of Hungarian or Austrian ethnicity, became aware of the empire's destabilization.

== Assessment ==
Although performance in the initial months of the war against Serbia and Russia is often seen as poor, Austro-Hungarian forces were not helped by internal division and indecision among the army high command and possession by Serbian and Russian forces of highly detailed versions of Austro-Hungarian war plans. Overall during the Military's greatest deployment – World War I – and despite persistent fears of disloyalty and division among the Empire's many nationalities, the forces of Austria-Hungary must be seen as having performing largely competently until political demise in late 1918. Imperial forces performed with both great proficiency – the Otranto Raid, Caporetto, the Romanian campaign and the dogged defence of the Isonzo; and with appalling effect – the 1914 Serbian campaign, the Galicia Campaign, the Brusilov Offensive, the Battle of Monte Grappa, the two battles of the Piave River, Vittorio Veneto; as well as at a variety of standards in between. Ultimately, and with much German support, Imperial armed forces held firm, and without much by way of large-scale defections among what were seen as 'suspect' elements of the population until the dying days of the war when political dissent at home led to large-scale defeats both on the front and at Sea as the war came to a close.

== Legacy ==
Some of the traditions of the old Austro-Hungarian Army continue to be carried on in the modern Austrian Army. For example, the most famous regiment in the Bundesheer is the "4th Infantry Regiment "Hoch- und Deutschmeister"", now known as Jägerregiment Wien based in "Maria Theresien Kaserne", named after Empress Maria Theresa of Austria. Many other regiments of the Bundesheer carry on traditions of the famous Austro-Hungarian regiments like "Kaiserjäger", "Rainer", etc.

== Gallery ==
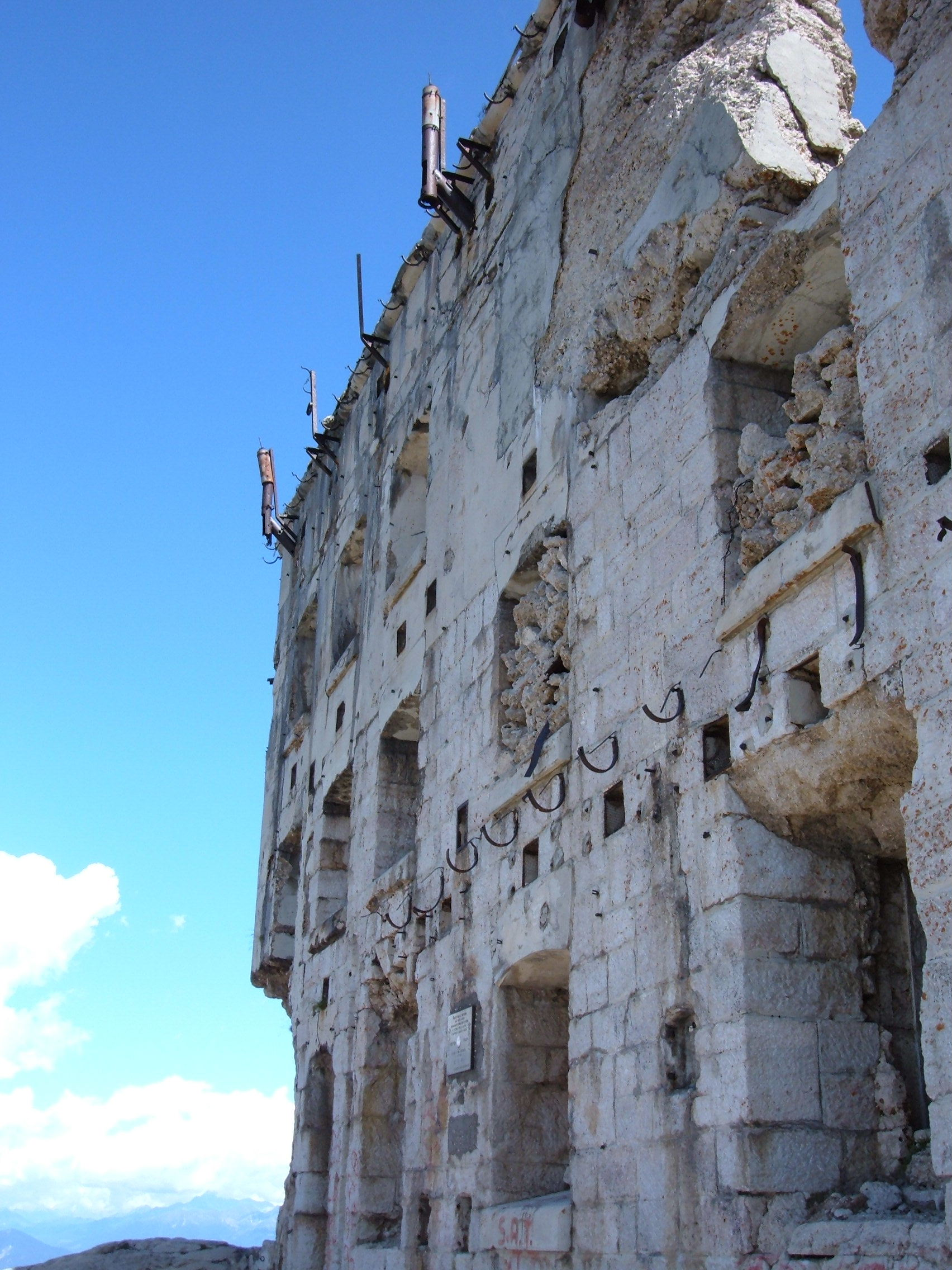
Fort Vezzena

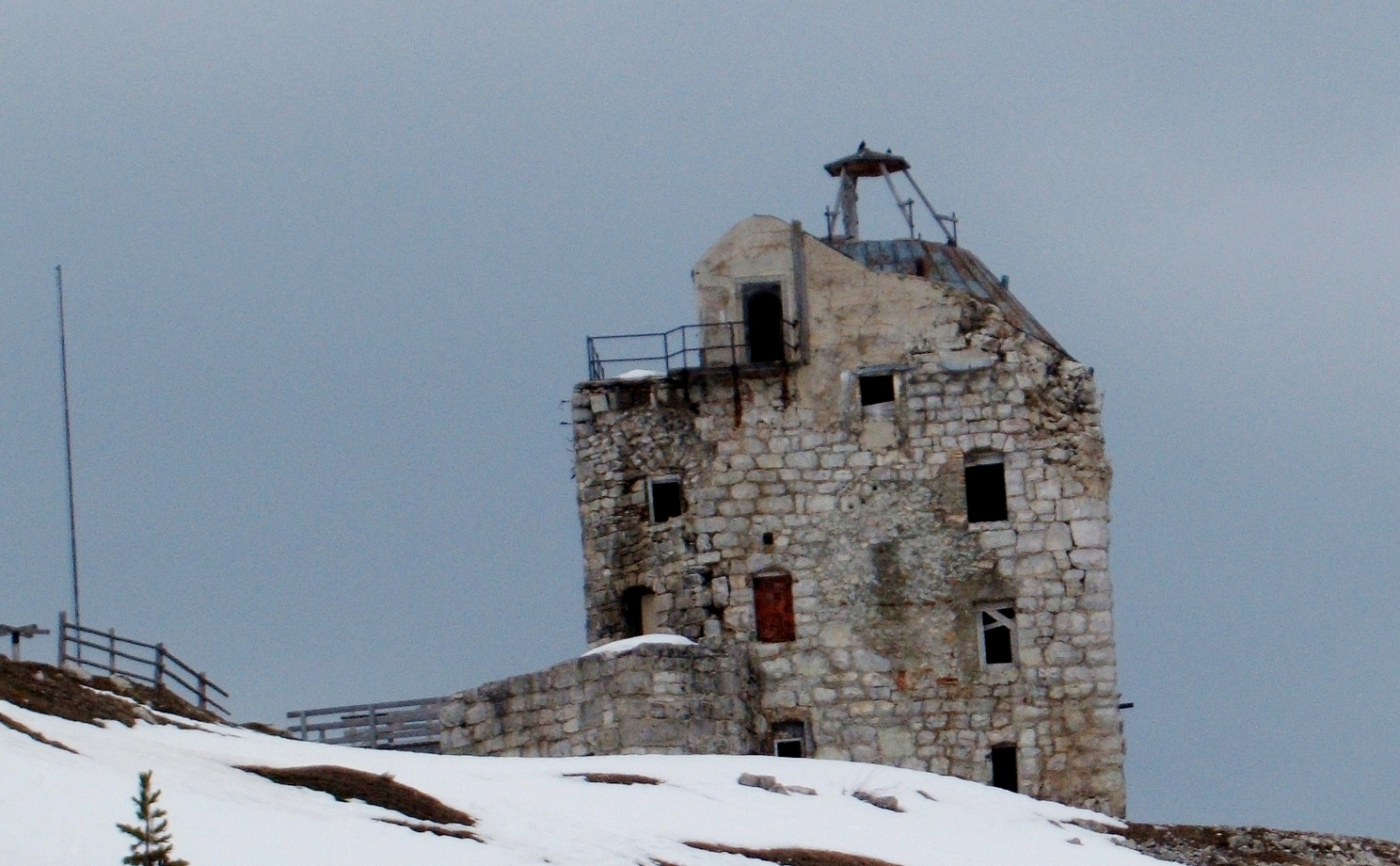
Fort Prato Piazza

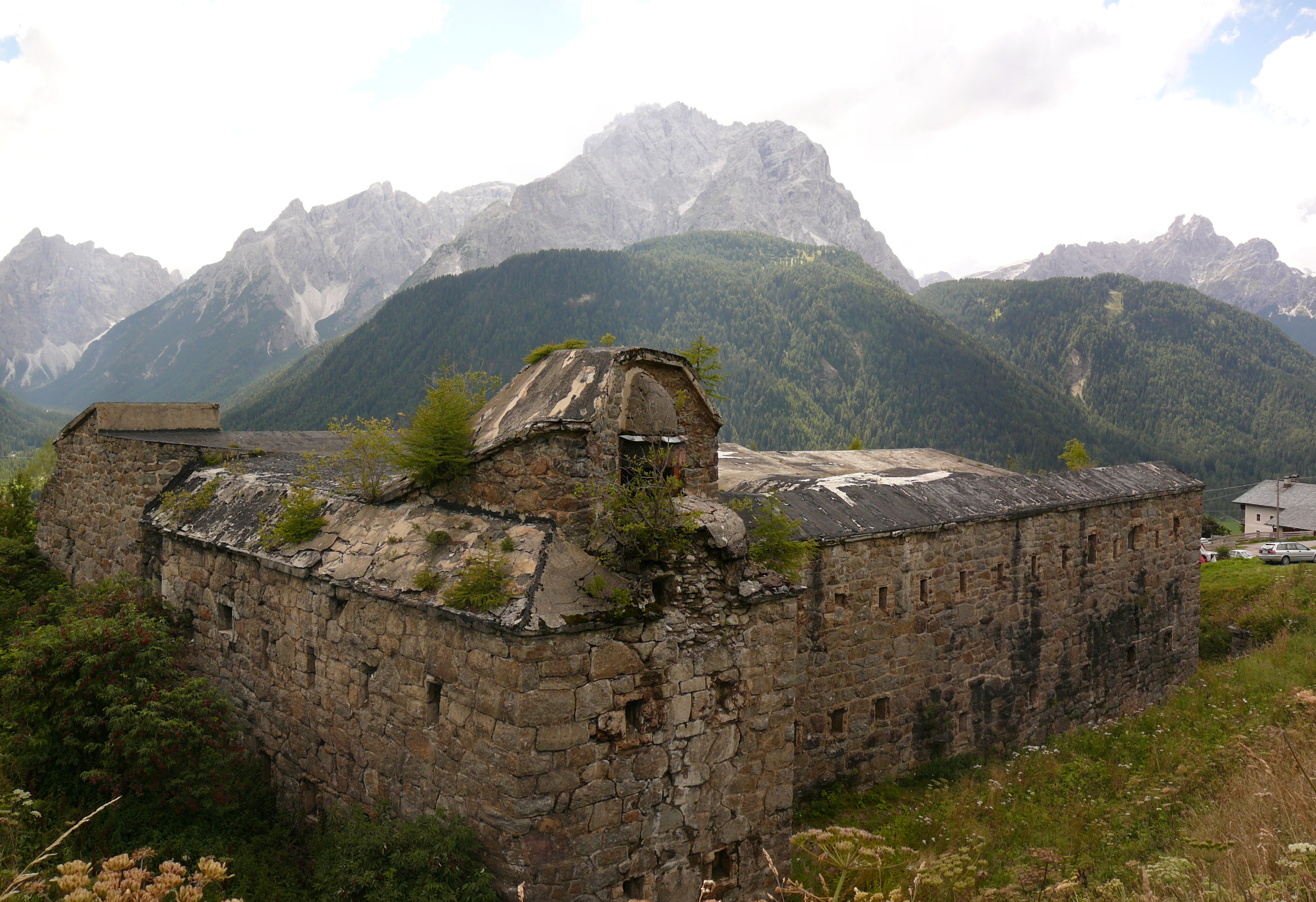
Fort Mitterberga

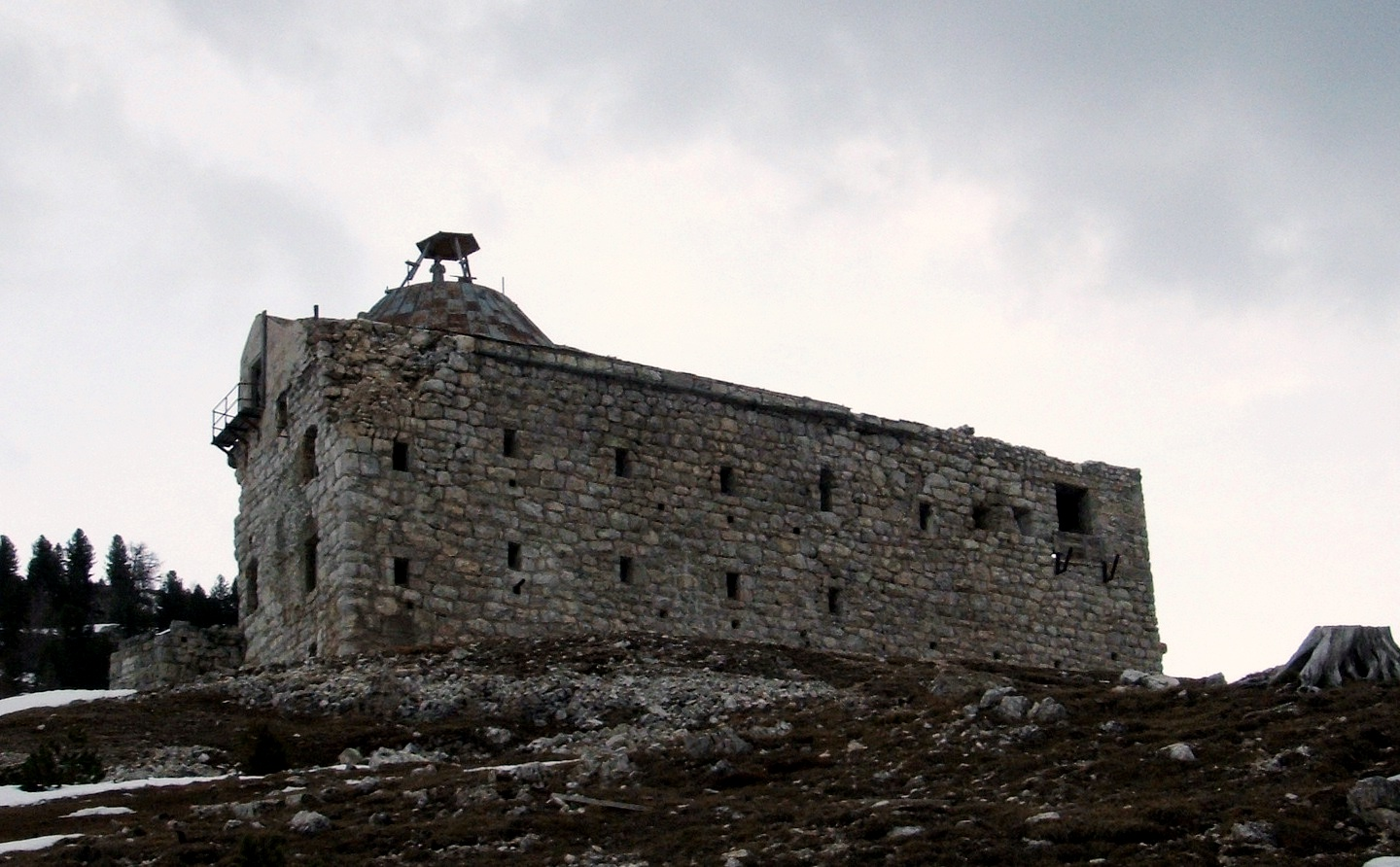
Fort Prato Piazza

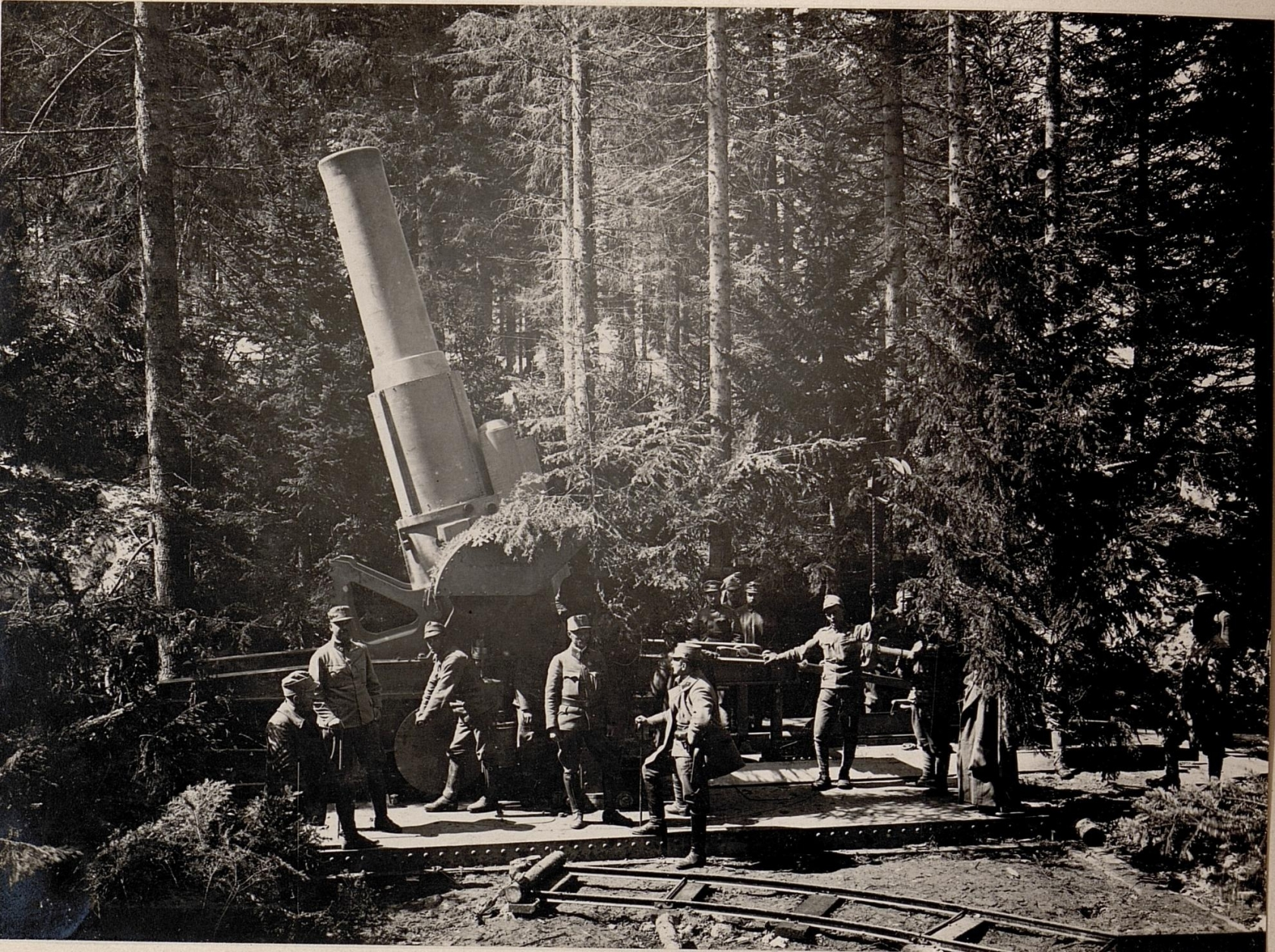
38 cm Belagerungshaubitze M 16 howitzer in action

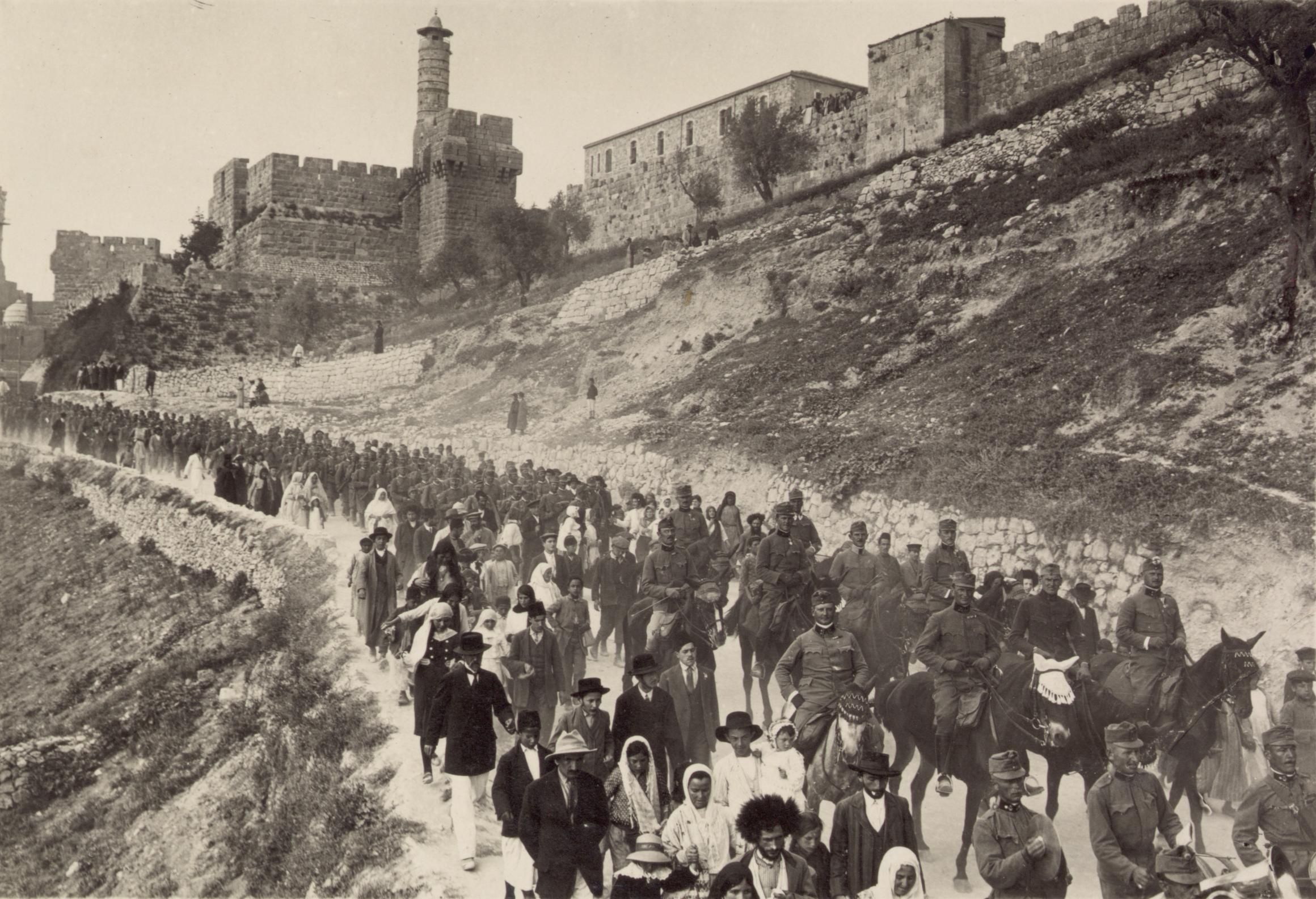
Austro-Hungarian troops leaving Jerusalem, 1916

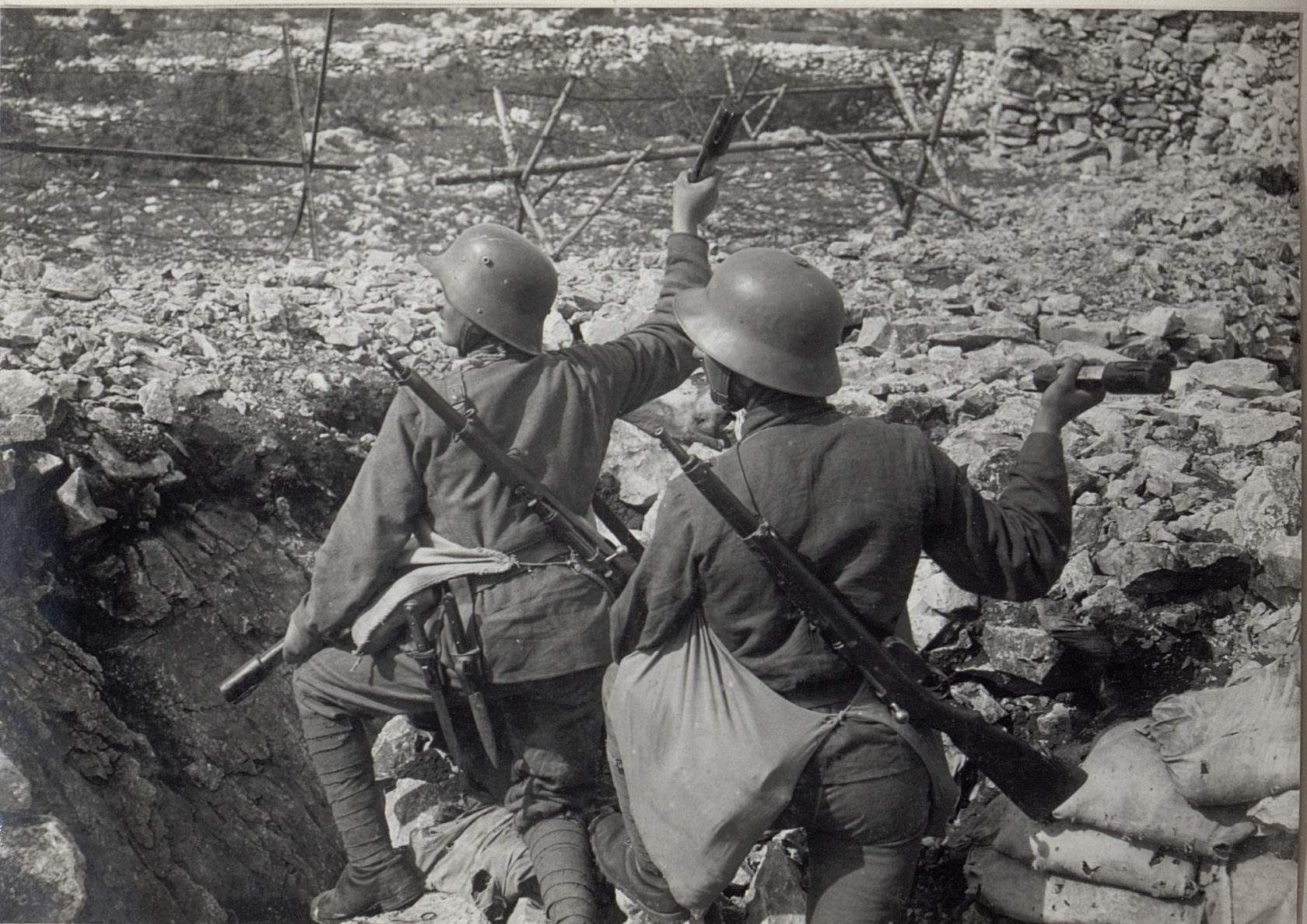
Austro-Hungarian troops in action, 1917

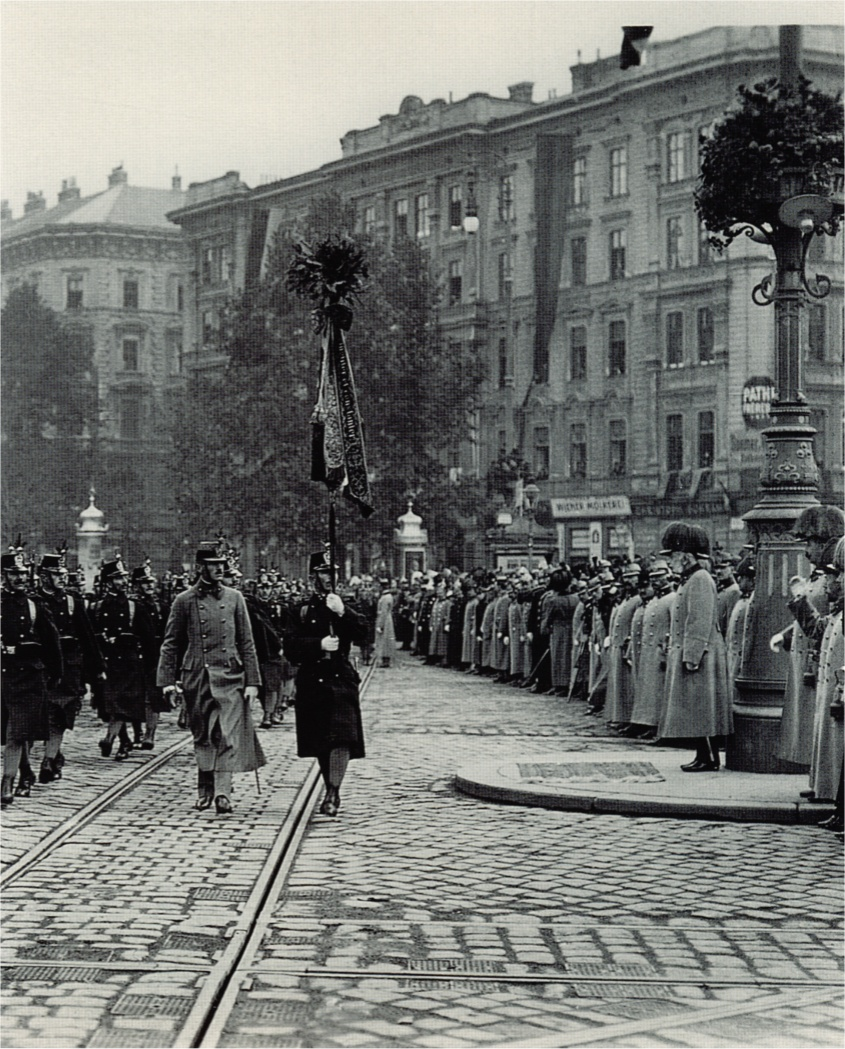
Austro-Hungarian infantry march past Emperor Franz Joseph I on the centenary of the Battle of Leipzig, 1813

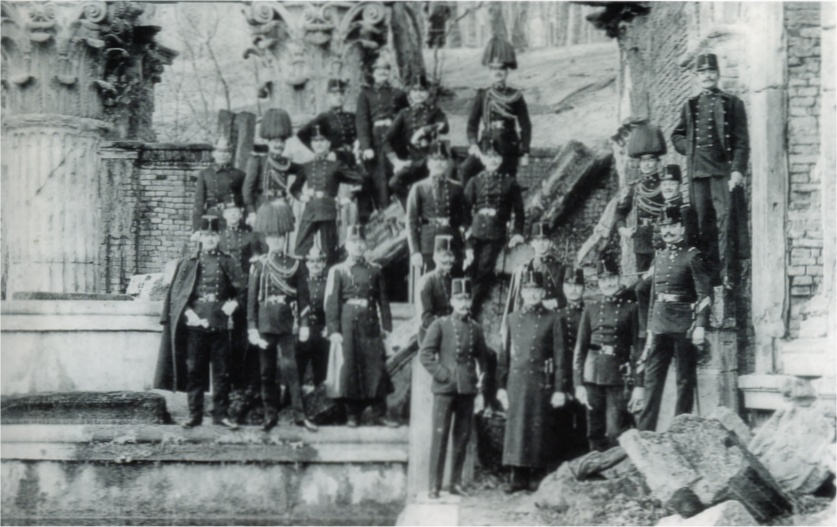
The Imperial Guard posing at Schönbrunn

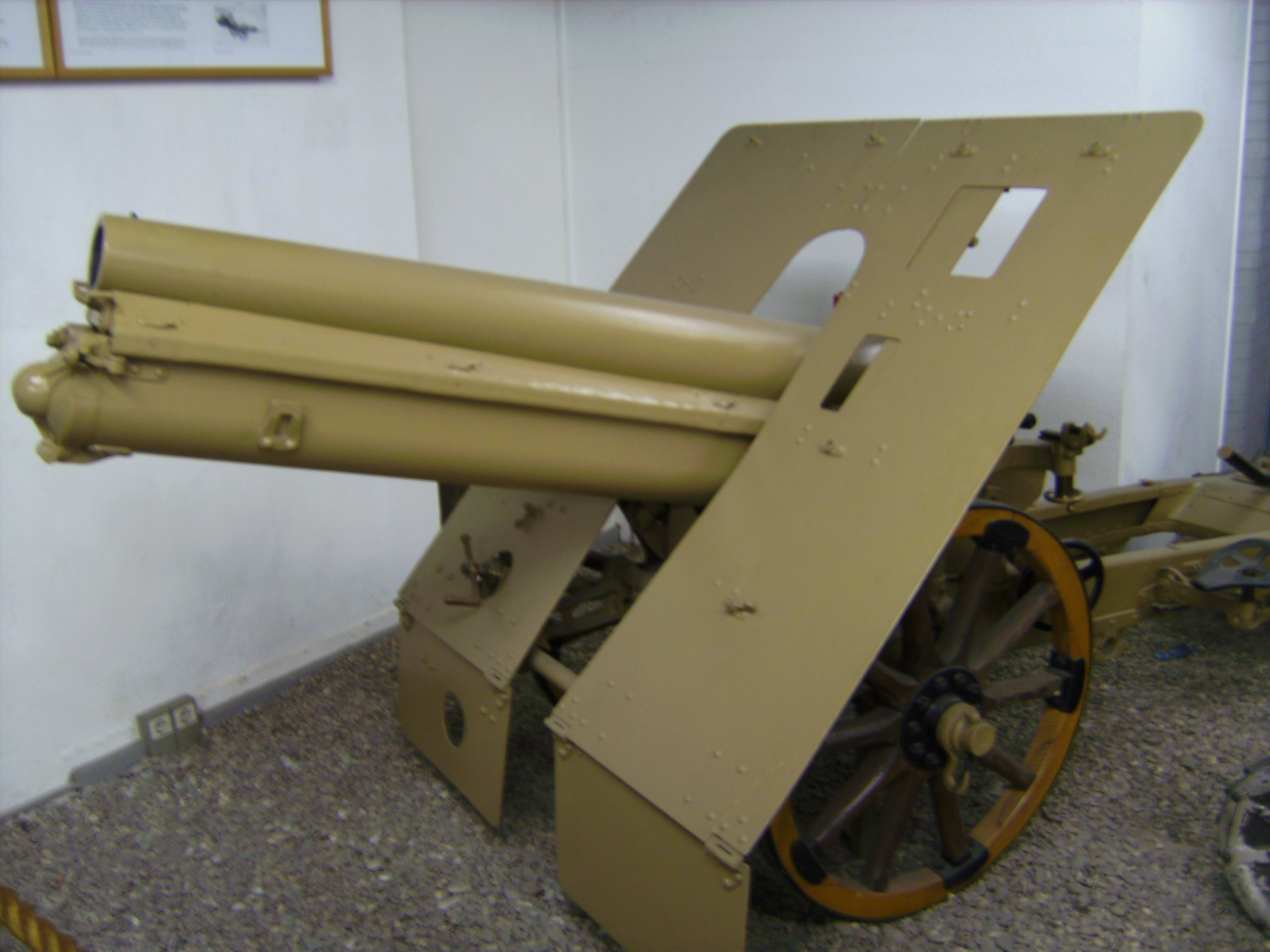
Skoda 100 mm mountain howitzer

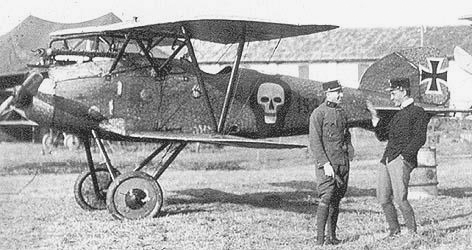
Austro-Hungarian World War I fighter plane

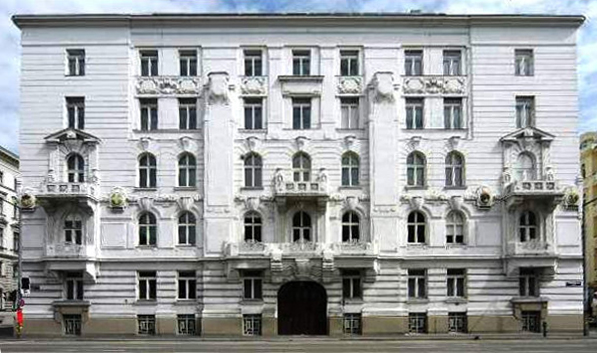
The Naval Section of the War Ministry Headquarters

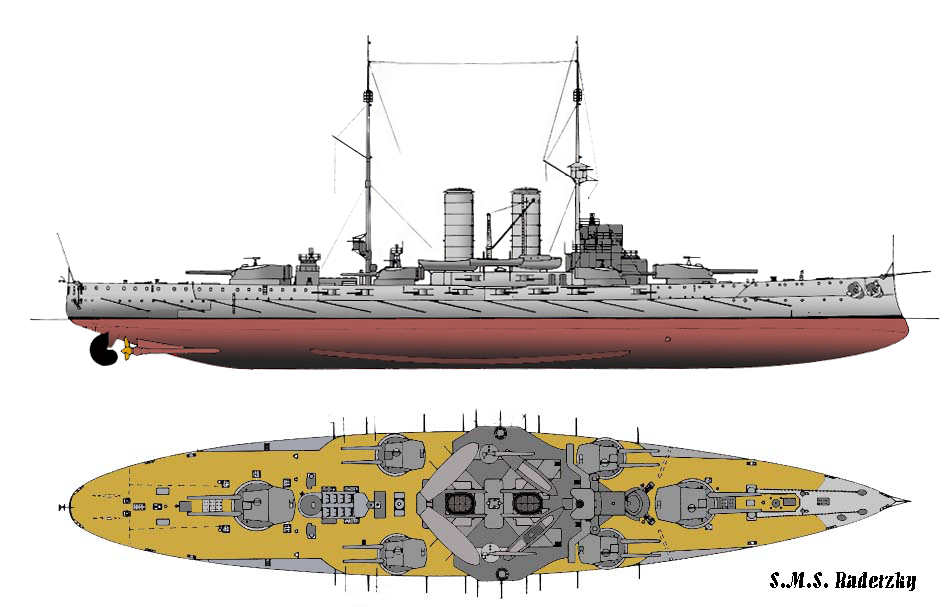
Radetzky-class pre-dreadnought

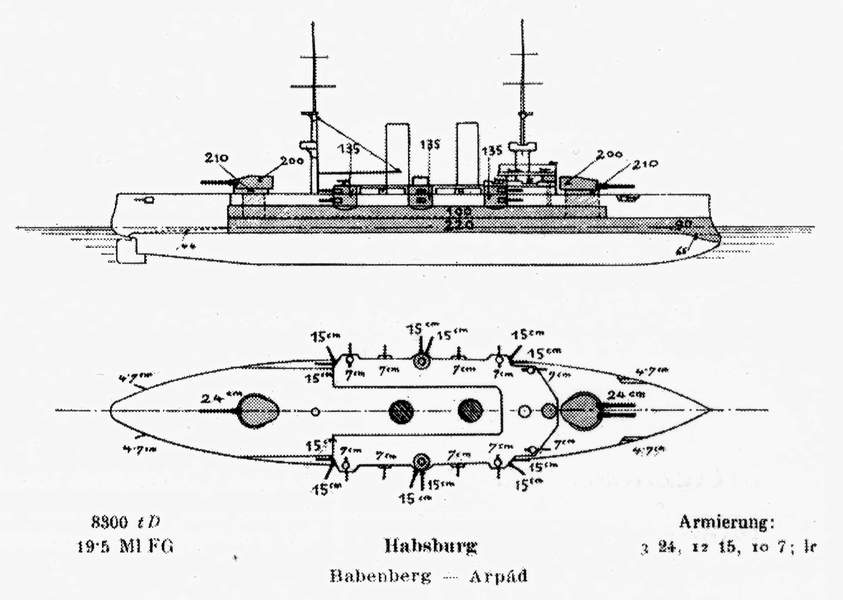
Habsburg-class pre-dreadnought

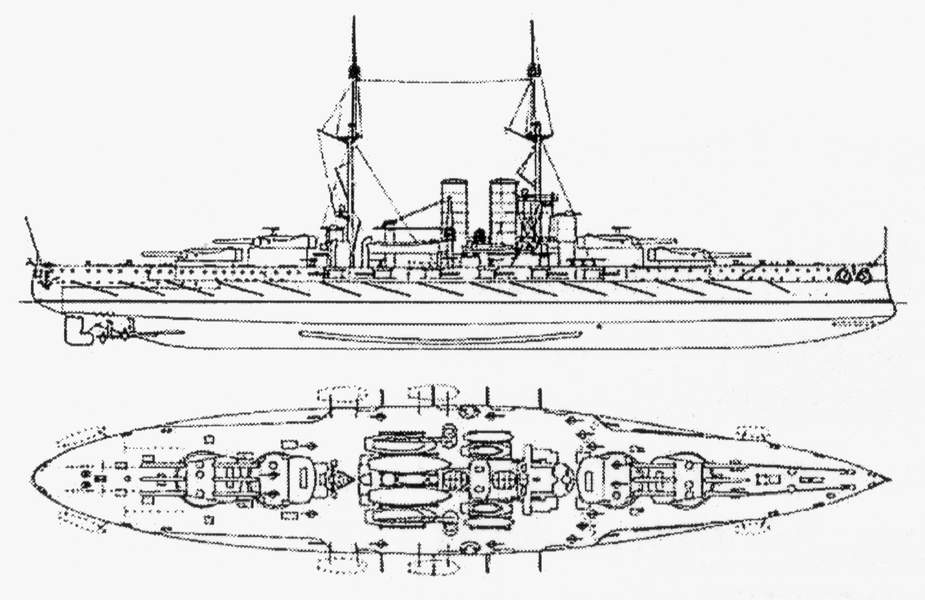
Viribus Unitis-class Dreadnought

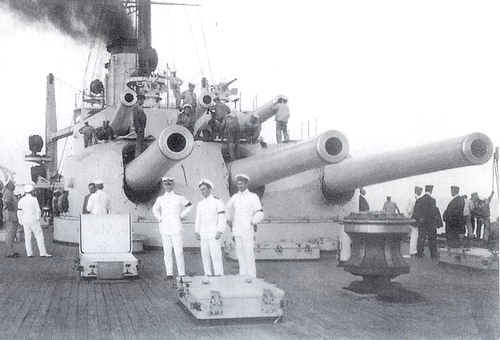
Turrets of the SMS Tegetthoff

== See also ==
- Austro-Hungarian Stormtroopers, an elite special force of Austria-Hungary
- Imperial and Royal Army during the Napoleonic Wars
- Military history of Austria
- Ministry of War
- Royal Hungarian Army
- Chief of the Military Chancery (Austria-Hungary)
