= Battle of Radujevac =

Part of Russo-Turkish War (1735–1739)

Battle of Radujevac (1737)
- Part of the Austro-Turkish War of 1737–1739
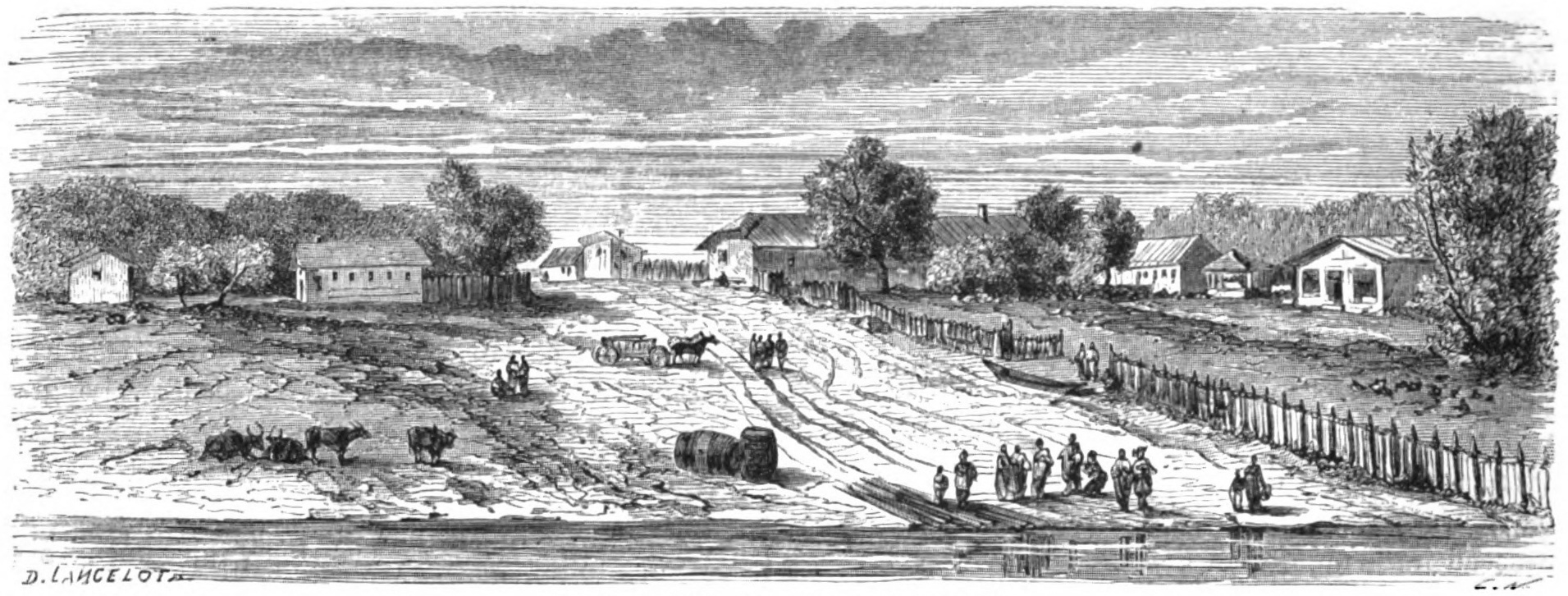
- Village of Radujevac
Date	28–29 September 1737
Location	Radujevac, Ottoman Empire
Result	Ottoman victory

Belligerents
Habsburg monarchy	Ottoman Empire

Commanders and leaders
(Habsburg monarchy) Ludwig Andreas von Khevenhüller (Habsburg monarchy) Colonel Helfrich	Ivaz Mehmed Pasha

Strength
9,000 men	16,000 men

Casualties and losses
512 killed	Unknown

The Battle of Radujevac was a battle of the Austro-Turkish War of 1737–1739 that took place near Vidin on September 28, 1737, near Radujevac, the Ottoman troops won the battle and forced the Austrians to retreat.

== Background ==
In July 1737, the Austrians joined the war with Russia against the Ottomans. The first Austrian success was the capture of Niš on 28 July. Soon after this capture, the Austrians headed towards Vidin. They dispatched the field marshal, Ludwig Andreas von Khevenhüller, with a force of 9,000 men. Due to terrain conditions, they marched in several squadrons. Khevenhüller had some warships to cover the bridge to cross the Timok River. Khevenhüller arrived in Vidin on August 10 and called the Ottoman garrison led by Ivaz Mehmed Pasha to surrender, however; they refused. Khevenhüller ordered a reconnaissance unit of 500 cavalry led by Colonel Dragoni to inspect the fort. The unit advanced carelessly so much that the Ottomans made a sortie, surrounded them, and killed 228 within minutes.

Khevenhüller reported the situation to the field marshal, Friedrich Heinrich von Seckendorff. Seckendorff ordered him not to do anything until his arrival on August 27. A council was held and decided to abandon the planned siege of Vidin. Seckendorff then ordered the main army to retreat toward Niš, while Khevenhüller would cover up the march. At the village of Radujevac, where Khevenhüller set out, he was attacked by the Ottoman cavalry, he managed to repel them but at the same time, the Ottomans managed to capture 14 Imperial transport ships at Timok River.

== Battle ==
On September 28, the Ottoman army appeared before the Imperials and began constructing a bridge over the Timok near the village of Radujevac. Khevenhüller dispatched Colonel Helfrich to disrupt their work. The Imperial attacked them and after a three-hour battle, they burned the bridge and prevented the Ottomans from crossing while losing only 30 killed. Khevenhüller realized they were preparing for a more serious fight. He advanced 1000 paces in a battle formation in front of the camp while Colonel Helfrich was in the rear. The Ottomans advanced slowly against the Imperial front and flanks then attacked them with great shouts. The Ottoman attacks were repelled using effective fire from the Imperials.

However, at the same time, a swarm of sipahis crossed the Danube, set fire to the village of Radujevac, and attacked the Imperial camp, massacring the servants and the sick left behind. They began looting the camp. They then prepared to attack the rear but were repelled. The Ottoman attacks lasted until nightfall. The Ottomans returned to their camps but heavily occupied the riverbanks while the Imperials were underarms through the night. On the next day, Khevenhüller learned of the Ottoman plan to maneuver via Negotin. He then decided to retreat. The Ottomans attacked the rear of the Imperials during their retreat. The Austrian casualties amounted to 5 officers, 391 men, and 116 men in total being killed. The Ottomans had a force of 16,000 men during the battle.

== Aftermath ==
With the battle of Radujevac, the resilience of the Khevenhüller Corps was almost broken; due to battle losses, illnesses, and hardships, its ranks had thinned and the bonds of discipline had begun to loosen considerably. In particular, the behavior of the militia, who only saw their task as looting and plundering, was so atrocious that Khevenhüller felt compelled to send them back home in groups.

== Sources ==
- Robert Rainer von Lindenbüchel (1897), History of the Imperial and Royal Infantry Regiment No. 35, From the Peace of Passarowitz (Požarevac) in 1719 to the wars against the French Revolution in 1792.
- Julius Stanka (1894), History of the Imperial and Royal Infantry Regiment Archduke Carl No. 3, First Volume.
- József Bánlaky: Military history of the Hungarian nation (MEK-OSZK), 0014/1149. The military operations of 1737.
