= Grant R. Williams =

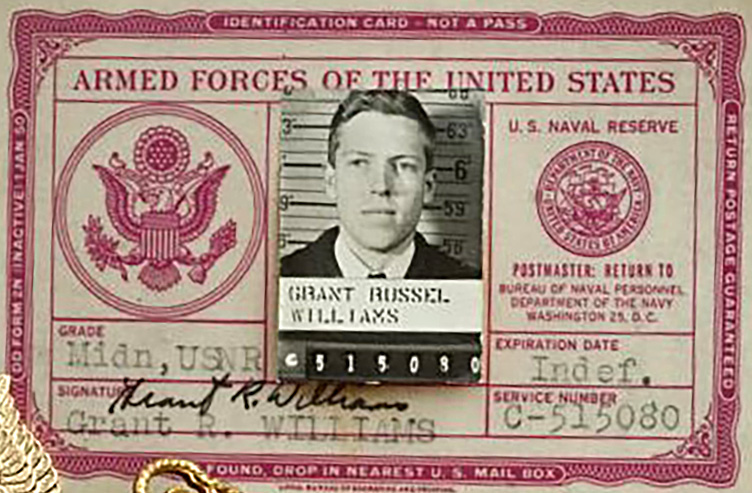
US Naval Reserve ID card of Grant Russell Williams

Lieutenant Grant Russell Williams (July 29, 1930 – April 26, 1964) was a U. S. Navy test pilot, of Webster Groves, Missouri. He was best known for diverting his crashing plane, a North American FJ-1 Fury, away from populated areas in Jacksonville, Florida, in April, 1964. Williams died in the crash; he was survived by his wife Kathleen and his four preschool children.

Williams had eight sisters, including Margaret W. Asprey, and one who died in early childhood.
