= Ludwig Andreas von Khevenhüller =

Austrian field marshal (1683–1744)

Ludwig Andreas Khevenhüller, Count von Aichelberg-Frankenburg
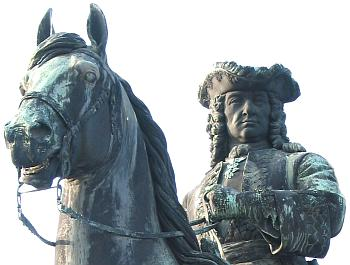
- Field-Marshal Khevenhüller, part of the Maria Theresia monument in Vienna
- Born: 30 November 1683; Linz, Archduchy of Austria
- Died: 26 January 1744 (aged 60); Vienna
- Military career
- Allegiance: Holy Roman Empire
- Branch: Imperial Army
- Rank: Generalfeldmarschall
- Conflicts: Great Turkish War; Battle of Zenta; War of the Spanish Succession; Ottoman–Venetian War; Austro-Turkish War; Battle of Petrovaradin; Battle of Guastalla; Siege of Belgrade; War of the Quadruple Alliance; Anglo-Spanish War; War of the Polish Succession; Battle of San Pietro; Battle of Guastalla; Austro-Turkish War; Battle of Radujevac; War of the Austrian Succession; Battle of Schärding; Capitulation of Linz; Battle of Simbach
- Awards: Order of the Golden Fleece, 1744

Ludwig Andreas von Khevenhüller, Graf von Frankenburg-Aichleberg (English: Louis Andrew of Khevenhüller, Count of Aichelberg-Frankenburg) (30 November 1683 – 26 January 1744) was a prominent Austrian field marshal.

== Early life ==
Andreas was born into an ancient House of Khevenhüller, a German noble family that was originally from Franconia and settled in Carinthia. He was the second surviving son of Count Franz Christoph von Khevenhüller-Frankenberg-Aichleberg (1634-1684) and his wife, Countess Faustina Barbara Montecuccoli (1663-1701), thus he was a grandson of Raimondo Montecuccoli.

== Career ==
He first saw active service under Prince Eugene of Savoy in the War of the Spanish Succession and by 1716 had been given command of Prince Eugene's own regiment of dragoons. He distinguished himself at the Battles of Peterwardein (5 August 1716) and Belgrade (1717) and became in 1723 General-Feldwachtmeister (equivalent to major general), in 1726 Colonel-Proprietor a Dragoon regiment and in 1733 Feldmarschalleutnant (equivalent to lieutenant-general).

In 1734 the War of the Polish Succession brought him into the field again. He was present at the Battle of Parma (29 June 1734), where Count Mercy, the Austrian commander, was killed, and after Mercy's death he held the chief command of the army in Italy until the arrival of Field Marshal Königsegg under whom he again distinguished himself at the Battle of Guastalla (19 September 1734). He was once more in command during the operations which followed the battle, and his skillful generalship won for him the grade of General of Cavalry. He continued in military and diplomatic employment in Italy to the close of the war.

In 1737 Khevenhüller was made Field Marshal, Prince Eugene recommending him to his sovereign as the best general in the service. His chief exploit in the Turkish War, which soon followed his promotion, was at the Battle of Radojevatz (28 September 1737), where he cut his way through a greatly superior Turkish army. In 1738/9 Khevenhüller met severe budgetary restrictions with an elaborate army reduction scheme. This was successful, and led to his appointment as commander-in-chief of the Vienna garrison.

Khevenhüller surpassed himself in the War of the Austrian Succession. As commander-in-chief of the army on the Danube he not only drove out the French and Bavarian invaders of Austria in a few days of rapid marching and sharp engagements (January 1742), but overran southern Bavaria, captured Munich, and forced a large French corps in Linz to surrender. Later in the summer of 1742, owing to the inadequate forces at his disposal, he had to evacuate his conquests, but in the following campaign, though now subordinated to Prince Charles of Lorraine, Khevenhüller reconquered southern Bavaria, and in June forced the emperor to conclude the unfavourable Convention of Nieder-Schönfeld. He disapproved of the advance beyond the Rhine which followed these successes, and events showed that his fears were justified, for the Austrians had to fall back from the Rhine through Franconia and the Breisgau. Khevenhüller, however, conducted the retreat with admirable skill.

On his return to Vienna, Maria Theresa decorated the field marshal with the Order of the Golden Fleece. He died suddenly at Vienna on 26 January 1744.

== Personal life ==
On 29 September 1719 he was married to Countess Philippina von Lamberg (1695-1762), daughter of Prince Leopold Mathias Sigismund von Lamberg (1667-1711) and his wife, Countess Maria Claudia Künigl von Ehrenburg und Warth (1669-1710). They had two daughters:

- Countess Marie Antoinette von Khevenhüller-Frankenberg (1726-1746), married to Count Leopold Karl von Windisch-Graetz (1718-1746)
- Countess Maria Theresia von Khevenhüller-Frankenberg (1728-1815), married to Count Gottlieb von Windisch-Graetz (1715-1784)

== Military instruction manual ==
Khevenhüller wrote various instructional works for officers and soldiers: (Des G. F. M. Grafen von Khevenhüller Observationspunkte für sein Dragoner-Regiment (1734 and 1748) and a règlement for the infantry (1737)), and two important works on war in general, Kurzer Begriff aller militärischen Operationen (Vienna, 1756; French version, Maximes de guerre, Paris, 1771); and "Ideen vom Kriege," posthumously published in Mittheilungen des k. und k. Kriegsarchiv, Neue Folge 7–8 (1893–4): 286–441 and 319–97.

== Ancestry ==
Ancestors of Ludwig Andreas von Khevenhüller

16. Christoph Khevenhüller of Aichelberg
8. Baron Bartholomäus Khevenhüller
17. Elisabeth Mannsdorfer
4. Count Franz Christoph Khevenhüller of Frankenburg
18. Count Franz of Thurn and Valsassina
9. Countess Blanka Ludmilla of Thurn and Valsassina
19. Countess Barbara Schlick of Passaun
2. Franz Christoph Khevenhüller, Count of Frankenburg
20. Baron Andreas Teuffel of Bockfliess
10. Karl Teuffel, Baron of Gundersdorf
21. Baroness Marie Anna von Waldstein
5. Baroness Barbara Teuffel of Gundersdorf
22. Baron Oswald II, of Eitzing-Schrattenthal
11. Baroness Judith of Eitzing-Schrattenthal
23. Barbara Pamffling
1. Ludwig Andreas of Khevenhüller
24. Don Fabrizio I, Count of Montecuccoli
12. Don Galeotto IV, Count of Montecuccoli
25. Donna Paola Stavili
6. Raimondo, Prince of Montecuccoli, Duke of Melfi
26. Don Antonio Mario Bigi
13. Donna Anna Bigi
27. Donna Lucrezia Pigni
3. Countess Ernestine Montecuccoli
28. Count Sigmund of Dietrichstein-Hollenburg
14. Maximilian, 1st Prince of Dietrichstein
29. Johanna von der Leiter, Heiress of Amerang
7. Countess Margarethe of Dietrichstein-Nikolsburg
30. Karl I, Prince of Liechtenstein
15. Princess Anna Marie of Liechtenstein
31. Baroness Anna Marie of Boskovice and Černá Hora
