= War in the Shadows =

War in the Shadows: The Guerrilla in History is a historical study of guerrilla warfare by the American military historian Robert B. Asprey (1923–2009), first published in 1975 by Doubleday. The work is considered Asprey's most influential book and provides a comprehensive survey of irregular warfare spanning over 2,500 years, ranging from the days of Alexander the Great, through Soviet partisans fighting in World War II, to contemporary conflicts. It places particular emphasis on the Vietnam War and other 20th-century guerrilla conflicts, as well as underground operations that took place alongside conventional wars.

== Overview ==
The book examines the development and impact of guerrilla warfare from early insurgencies to modern conflicts. Asprey explores both independent guerrilla campaigns and irregular actions integrated within conventional wars, highlighting the strategies, tactics, and historical significance of insurgent forces.

== Content ==
The original 1975 edition was published in two volumes, titled Lenin's Heritage. Mao and Revolutionary China and Ho... Ho... Ho Chi Minh, comprising a total of 1,622 pages. The book covers a wide range of conflicts and figures, including the American Revolutionary War (notably Francis Marion, the "Swamp Fox"), the Peninsular War, the Philippine–American War, the Boer War, the Mexican Revolution (Pancho Villa, Emiliano Zapata), Paul von Lettow-Vorbeck in East Africa during World War I, T. E. Lawrence in Arabia, resistance movements during World War II, the Greek Civil War, the Mau Mau Uprising in Kenya, the Cyprus Emergency, the Algerian War, and insurgencies in Latin America and Asia. It also examines major guerrilla leaders and theorists such as Mao Zedong, Ho Chi Minh, Võ Nguyên Giáp, Fidel Castro, and figures involved in the OSS, Orde Wingate, and William Slim. The book further analyzes the domino theory, the Việt Minh, the Viet Cong, and significant operations like the Tet Offensive.

In contrast to Walter Laqueur (1921–2018) for example, Asprey used, as noted by the German historian Gerhard Wiechmann, a very broad concept of guerrilla warfare, which also included irregular combat operations on both sides in antiquity.

== Editions ==
The original two-volume edition was published in 1975 by Doubleday. A revised and abridged single-volume edition was released in 1994, including additional chapters covering the conclusion of the Vietnam War and subsequent guerrilla conflicts.

== See also ==
- Guerrilla warfare
- Counter-insurgency

== Bibliography ==
- Robert B. Asprey: War in the Shadows: The Guerrilla in History. 2 vols. New York: Doubleday, 1975
- Robert B. Asprey: War in the Shadows: The Guerrilla in History. New York: William Morrow, 1994 (an updated one-volume edition)
- Robert B. Asprey: War in the Shadows. The Guerrilla in History, 2 vols., Lincoln, NE 2002
