= Winifred Asprey =

American computer scientist and mathematician

- Born: April 8, 1917; Sioux City, Iowa
- Died: October 19, 2007 (aged 90); Poughkeepsie, New York
- Education: Vassar College; University of Iowa
- Scientific career
- Fields: Mathematics, computer science
- Doctoral advisor: Edward Wilson Chittenden

Winifred "Tim" Alice Asprey (April 8, 1917 – October 19, 2007) was an American mathematician and computer scientist. She was one of only around 200 women to earn PhDs in mathematics from American universities during the 1940s, a period of women's underrepresentation in mathematics at this level. She was involved in developing the close contact between Vassar College and IBM that led to the establishment of the first computer science lab at Vassar.

== Family ==
Asprey was born in Sioux City, Iowa; her parents were Gladys Brown Asprey, Vassar class of 1905, and Peter Asprey Jr. She had two brothers, actinide and fluorine chemist Larned B. Asprey (1919–2005), a signer of the Szilárd petition, and military historian and writer Robert B. Asprey (1923–2009) who dedicated several of his books to his sister Winifred.

== Education and work ==
Asprey attended Vassar College in Poughkeepsie, New York, where she earned her undergraduate degree in 1938. As a student there, Asprey met Grace Hopper, the "First Lady of Computing," who taught mathematics at the time. After graduating, Asprey taught at several private schools in New York City and Chicago before going on to earn her MS and PhD degrees from the University of Iowa in 1942 and 1945, respectively. Her doctoral advisor was the topologist Edward Wilson Chittenden.

Asprey returned to Vassar College as a professor. By then, Grace Hopper had moved to Philadelphia to work on UNIVAC (Universal Automatic Computer) project. Asprey became interested in computing and visited Hopper to learn about the foundations of computer architecture. Asprey believed that computers would be an essential part of a liberal arts education.

At Vassar, Asprey taught mathematics and computer science for 38 years and was the chair of the mathematics department from 1957 until her retirement in 1982. She created the first Computer Science courses at Vassar, the first being taught in 1963, and secured funds for the college's first computer, making Vassar the second college in the nation to acquire an IBM System/360 computer in 1967. Asprey connected with researchers at IBM and other research centers and lobbied for computer science at Vassar. In 1989, due to her contributions, the computer center she started was renamed the Asprey Advanced Computation Laboratory.
