= Charles Asprey =

English cricketer

Personal information
- Full name: Charles Asprey
- Born: 1 November 1813; Mitcham, Surrey, England
- Died: 11 February 1892 (aged 78); Godstone, Surrey, England
- Batting: Unknown

Career statistics
Competition	First-class
Matches	1
Runs scored	2
Batting average	2.00
100s/50s	–/–
Top score	2
Balls bowled	–
Wickets	–
Bowling average	–
5 wickets in innings	–
10 wickets in match	–
Best bowling	–
Catches/stumpings	–/–
- Source: Cricinfo, 29 June 2013

Charles Asprey (1 November 1813 – 11 February 1892) was an English first-class cricketer. Asprey's batting style is unknown. He was christened at Mitcham, Surrey on 15 April 1816.

Asprey made a single first-class appearance for the Surrey Club against the Marylebone Cricket Club at Lord's in 1852. In a match which ended as a draw, Asprey batted once, scoring 2 runs before he was dismissed by James Grundy. This was his only appearance in first-class cricket.

He died at Godstone, Surrey on 11 February 1892.
