= Treaty of Nymphenburg =

Treaty enlarging War of Austrian Succession

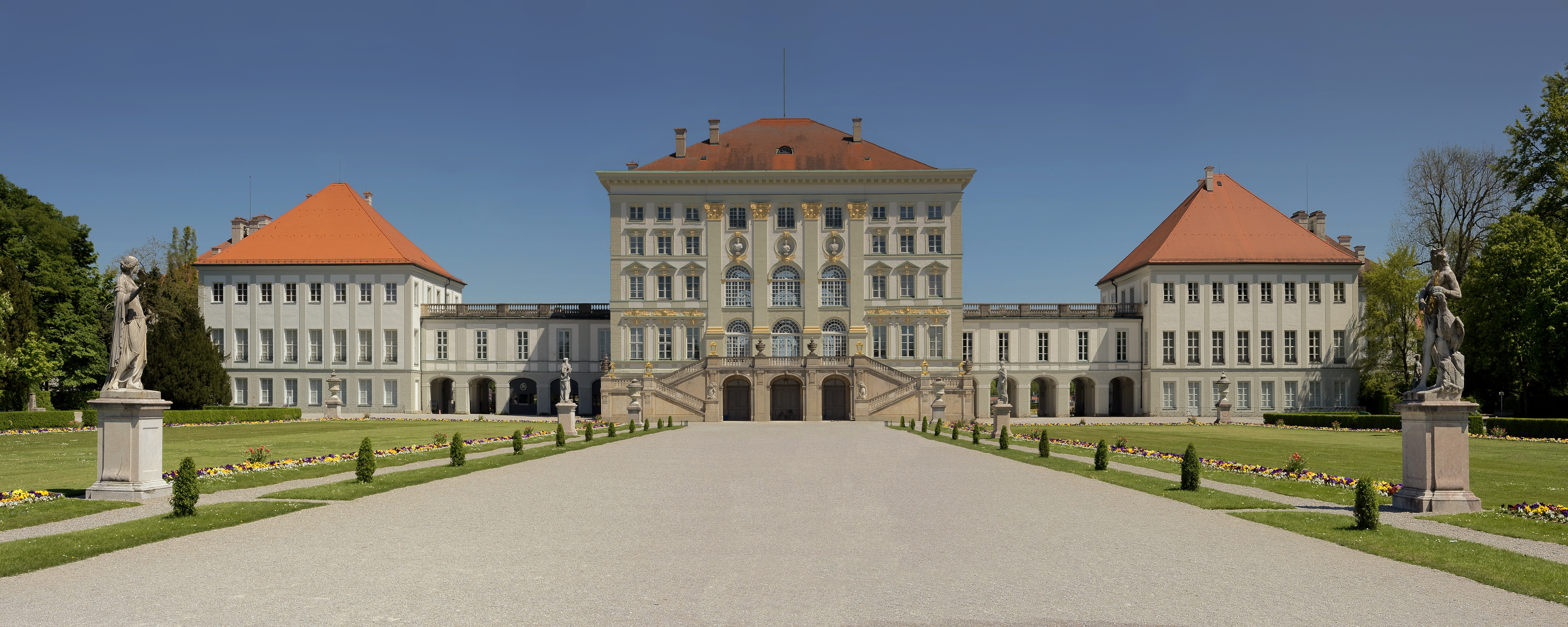
- Nymphenburg Palace in Munich, Bavaria
- Signed: 28 May 1741
- Location: Nymphenburg Palace in Munich, Bavaria
- Parties: Bavaria (signatory); Spain (signatory); (Kingdom of France) France; (Kingdom of Prussia) Prussia; (Electorate of Saxony) Saxony; (Kingdom of Sardinia) Savoy-Sardinia

The Treaty of Nymphenburg was a treaty between Bavaria and Spain that was concluded on May 28, 1741 at the Nymphenburg Palace in Munich. It was the first formal pact of a series of French-sponsored alliances against the Habsburg Monarch, Maria Theresa. Through the agreement, the Bavarian Elector Charles Albert gained the support of King Philip V of Spain to become the next Holy Roman Emperor against the claims of the Habsburgs. The treaty was brokered by Marshal Belleisle under the authority of Louis XV of France. As part of the negotiations, the French agreed to materially support Charles Albert's claims. The treaty signaled the expansion of the First Silesian War, which started as a local war between Prussia and the Habsburg Monarchy, into the War of the Austrian Succession, a pan-European conflict.

== Background ==
The major event leading up to this treaty was the death of the Habsburg Monarch and Holy Roman Emperor, Charles VI in October, 1740. Charles VI died without a son, so the succession fell to his daughter Maria Theresa. The Habsburg Monarchy had been subject to Salic law which excluded women from inheriting the Habsburg throne, but the 1713 Pragmatic Sanction, which the majority of major European courts agreed to, allowed a daughter of the emperor to succeed to the throne. Based on the Pragmatic Sanction, Maria Theresa assumed the throne.

In December 1740, Frederick II used the death of Charles VI and the uncertain status of Maria Theresa as an opportunity to invade and acquire the Habsburg Monarchy's province of Silesia for Prussia. This started the First Silesian War between Frederick II of Prussia and Maria Theresa of the Habsburg Monarchy. On 10 April 1741, the Prussian army defeated the Habsburg forces at the Battle of Mollwitz, which allowed Frederick to maintain his hold on Silesia and showed the military weakness of Maria Theresa's armies. This in turn, encouraged other courts to take advantage of the Habsburg Monarchy's apparent vulnerability to expand their own territories at the Habsburg's expense.

== Negotiations ==
Within two months of Frederick's victory at Mollwitz, Marshal Belleisle, who served under the authority of Louis XV of France, began a circuit of the courts of the Holy Roman Empire to find allies in a war against the Habsburg Monarchy. In May 1741, Bellisle went to Munich to negotiate with the Bavarian Elector Charles Albert, who wished to be crowned as the Holy Roman Emperor rather than an Austrian Habsburg heir. When Bellisle arrived, Charles Albert was already meeting with representatives of King Philip V of Spain regarding a military alliance against the Habsburg Monarchy, as Philip was looking for an opportunity to create a duchy for his son Don Philip from the Habsburg Monarchy's Italian territories. Bellisle quickly brought negotiations between Bavaria, Spain and France to a successful conclusion. He brokered a treaty between the Bavaria and Spain, which was signed on May 28, 1741 at the Nymphenburg Palace. In this treaty, Spain supported the claim of Charles Albert to become the next Holy Roman Emperor. In addition, Bellisle also committed France to an alliance with Bavaria, providing both financial and military support for Charles Albert's claim. Charles Albert later affirmed his personal commitment to these agreements by stating: "I will never separate myself from my friends and never conclude peace without their knowledge and approval". Although the French subsequently provided money and soldiers to support Charles Albert against the Habsburg Monarchy, there is still no reliable evidence that a formal written treaty between France and Bavaria existed.

== League of Nymphenburg ==
After the negotiations in Nymphenburg, Marshal Belleisle continued to expand the alliance against the Habsburg monarchy by recruiting other Central European courts. France signed a treaty with Frederick II of Prussia in June 1741, and another with Frederick Augustus II of Saxony in the following September. Charles Emmanuel III of Savoy-Sardinia also joined the alliance. This anti-Habsburg alliance of France, Spain, Bavaria, Prussia, Saxony and Savoy-Sardinia became known as the League of Nymphenburg. For their role in the alliance, each of the participants were promised portions of the Habsburg lands. This coalition effectively negated the Pragmatic Sanction through its agreement to carve up much of the Habsburg lands amongst themselves. As a result, the First Silesian War broadened into a continent-wide conflict, the War of Austrian Succession, as Maria Theresa defended the Habsburg monarchy against the array of European courts making up the League.

== Sources ==
- Anderson, Mark (1995). "The Prussian Invasion of Silesia and the Crisis of Habsburg Power". The War of the Austrian Succession. Routledge. ISBN 978-0582059504.
- Asprey, Robert B. (1986). "The First Silesian War, 1740-1742". Frederick the Great: The Magnificent Enigma. New York: Ticknor and Fields. ISBN 978-0-89919-352-6. (registration required)
- Bagge, Sverre (2019). "Formation of the European State System". State Formation in Europe, 843-1789. Taylor & Francis. ISBN 9780429589539.
- Bassett, Richard (2015). "Our Blood and Life: The Great Empress". For God and Kaiser: The Imperial Austrian Army, 1619-1918. Yale University Press. ISBN 9780300178586.
- Bright, James Franck (1897). "The War of Austrian Succession". Maria Theresa. Macmillan and Company, Limited.
- Browning, Reed (1995). The War of Austrian Succession. Routledge. ISBN 978-0582059504.
- Carlyle, Thomas (1862). "Belleisle and the Covenant-Breakers". History of Friedrich II of Prussia, Called Frederick the Great. Vol. III: Book XII – First Silesian War, Awakening a General European One, Begins – December 1740 – May 1741. London: Chapman & Hall.
- Chisolm, Hugh, ed. (1911). "Nymphenburg" . Encyclopædia Britannica. Vol. 19 (11th ed.). Cambridge University Press. p. 930.
- Clark, Christopher (2006). "Struggle for Mastery". Iron Kingdom: The Rise and Downfall of Prussia, 1600–1947. Cambridge, MA: Belknap Press. ISBN 978-0-674-02385-7. (registration required)
- Dyer, Thomas Henry (1877). "Chapter XLV: The Negotiations of Bellisle & The Treaty of Nymphenburg". Modern Europe, From the Fall of Constantinople to the Establishment of the German Empire, A.D. 1453-1871. Vol. IV: From 1714-1796. London: George Bell and Sons.
- Evans, Johnson A. (1896). "Reviewed Work: Le Maréchal de Ségur by Comte de Ségur". The English Historical Review. 11 (43): 591–592. JSTOR 547175. (registration required)
- Evans, R. J. W. (2016). "Communicating Empire: The Habsburgs and Their Critics, 1700-1919: The Prothero Lecture". Transactions of the Royal Historical Society. 19: 117–138. doi:10.1017/S0080440109990065. JSTOR 25593894. S2CID 162324631. (registration required)
- Guedalla, Phillip (1914). "The Rise of Prussia". The Partition of Europe: A Textbook of European History, 1715-1815. Oxford University Press.
- Horn, David Bayne (1964). Frederick the Great and the Rise of Prussia. London: English Universities Press.
- Hassall, Arthur (1908). "The War of Austrian Succession". The Balance of Power, 1715-1789. Rivingtons.
- Ingrao, Charles W. (2000). "The Prussian Challenge (1740-1763)". The Habsburg Monarchy, 1618-1815. Cambridge University Press. ISBN 978-0-521-78505-1.
- Judson, Pieter M. (2016). "The Accidental Empire". The Habsburg Empire: A New History. Harvard University Press.
- Kugler, Franz Theodor (1845) [1840]. "The Opening of the Silesian War". History of Frederick the Great: Comprehending a Complete History of the Silesian Campaigns and the Seven Years' War. Translated by Moriarty, Edward Aubrey. Illustrated by Menzel, Adolph. London: Henry G. Bohn.
- Menzel, Wolfgang (1890). "Maria Theresa". The History of Germany: From the Earliest Period to 1842 (Volume 3). G. Bell.
- Mowat, R. B. (1928). "A General War". A History of European Diplomacy,1451-1789. Longmans, Green & Co. (registration required)
- Ropes, Arthur R. (1889). "Reviewed Work: History of Prussia under Frederic the Great, 1740-1756 by Herbert Tuttle". The English Historical Review. 4 (15): 582–588. JSTOR 547032. (registration required)
- Schlosser, F. C. (1844). "From the Death of Frederick William I. Till the Peace of Aix La Chapelle". History of the eighteenth century and of the nineteenth till the overthrow of the French empire. With particular reference to mental cultivation and progress. Vol. III. Translated by Davison, D. Chapman and Hall.
- Smollett, Tobias (1836). The History of England: From the Revolution in 1688 to the Death of George the Second in 1760. Baudry's European Library.
- Tuttle, Herbert (1888). "The Diplomatic Interlude". History of Prussia under Frederic The Great 1740-1745. Cambridge, MA: Riverside Press.
