= Capitulation of Linz =

1742 battle between Austria and France

- Part of the War of the Austrian Succession
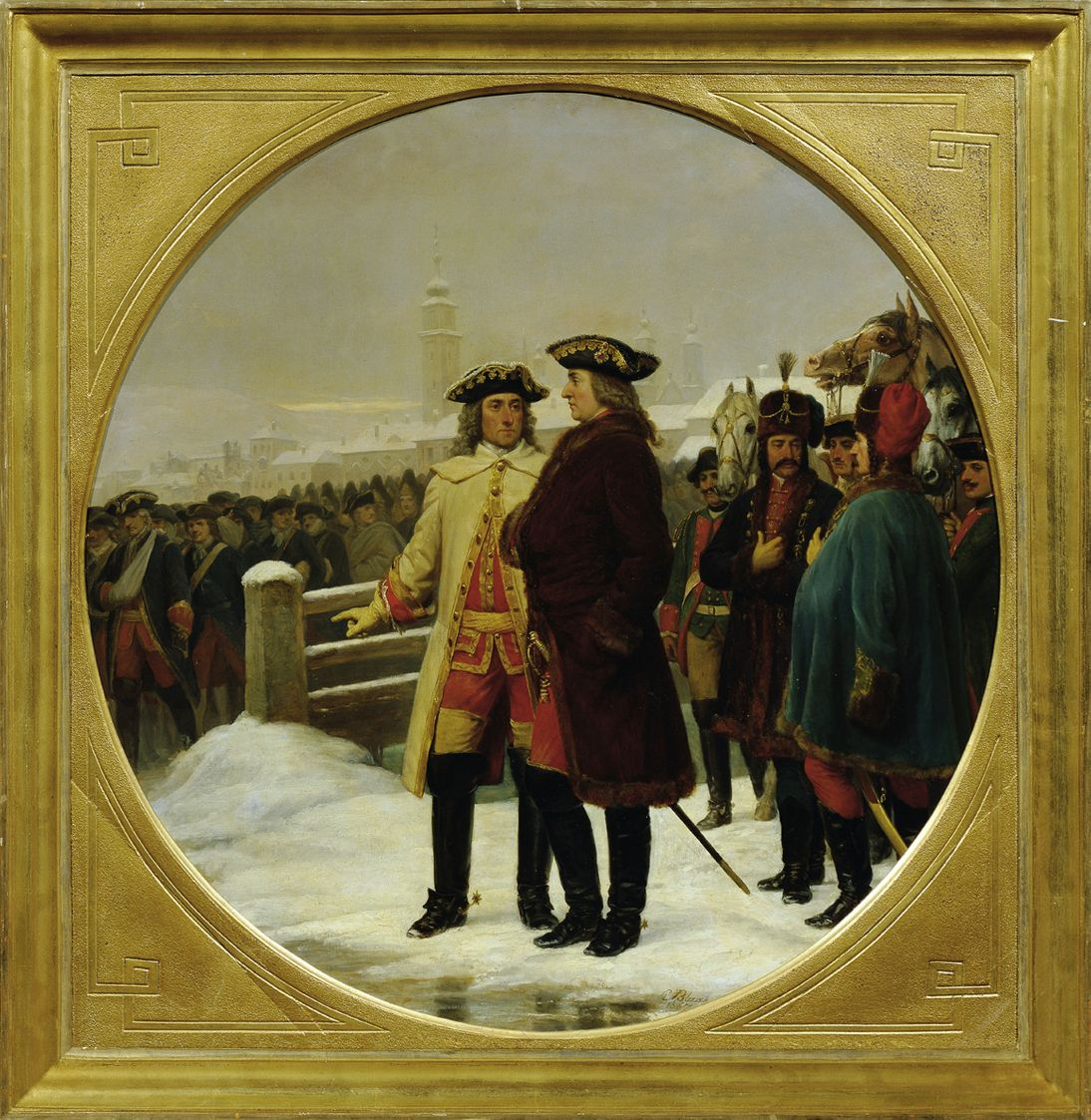
- Die Kapitulation von Linz 1742 by Karl von Blaas
| Date | January 1742 |
| Location | Linz, Austria |
| Result | Austrian victory |

Belligerents
| Austria | France |

Commanders and leaders
| (Habsburg monarchy) Ludwig Andreas von Khevenhüller | (Kingdom of France) Count de Ségur (surrendered) |

Strength
| 28,000 | 10,000 |

Casualties and losses
| Light | 10,000 surrendered |

The Capitulation of Linz was an action during the War of the Austrian Succession.

In January 1742 Austrian field marshal Ludwig Andreas von Khevenhüller successfully recaptured Linz and forced 10,000 French troops to surrender. Other sources say that the French commander threatened to completely destroy the city, and was allowed to retreat his troops into Bavaria for the return of an intact Linz.
