= Larned B. Asprey =

American chemist (1919–2005)

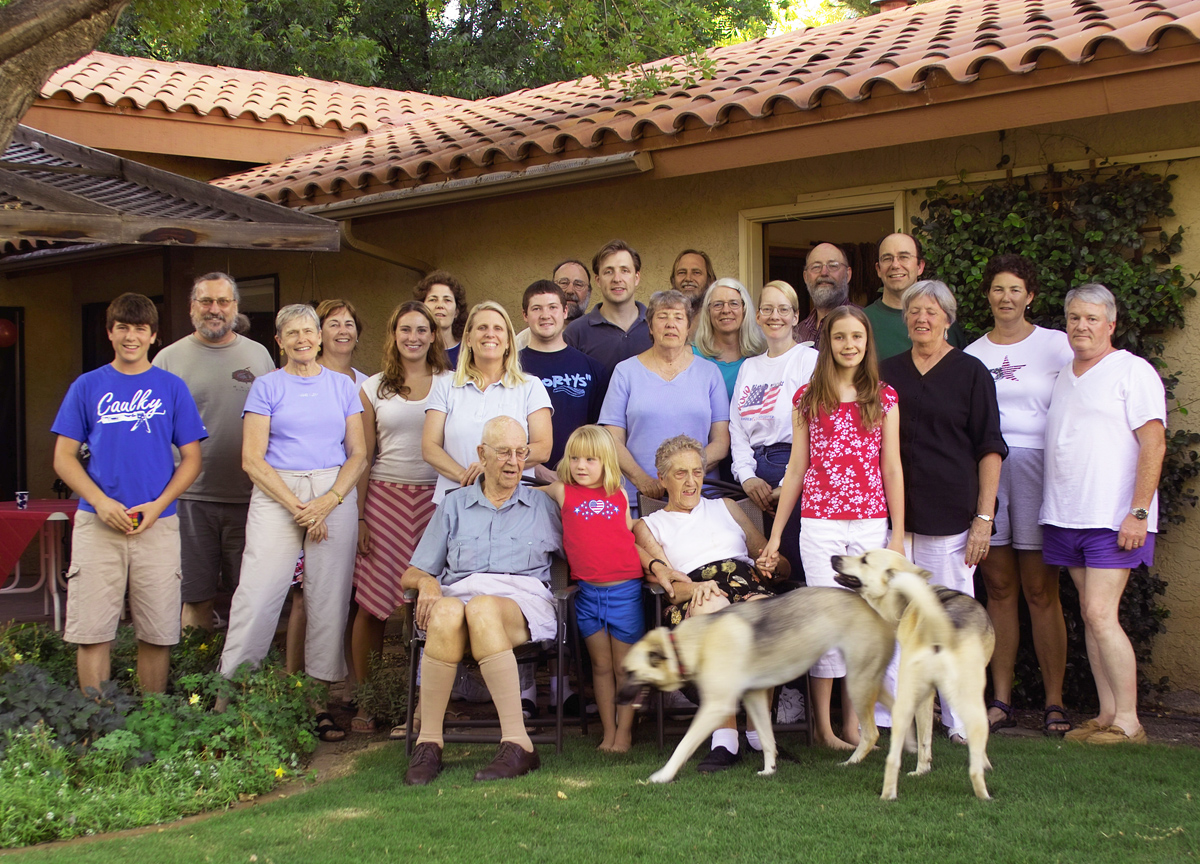
- Larry and Marge Asprey with their family, celebrating their 60th wedding anniversary in 2004
- Born: March 19, 1919; Sioux City, Iowa
- Died: March 6, 2005 (aged 85); Mesilla Park, New Mexico
- Education: Iowa State University; University of California, Berkeley
- Known for: Actinide, lanthanide, rare-earth and fluorine chemistry
- Awards: Glenn T. Seaborg Actinide Separations Award (1986)
- Scientific career
- Workplaces: Metallurgical Laboratory; Los Alamos National Laboratory
- Thesis: Equilibria in the oxide systems of praseodymium and americium (1949)
- Doctoral advisor: Burris B. Cunningham

Larned (Larry) Brown Asprey (March 19, 1919 – March 6, 2005) was an American chemist noted for his work on actinide, lanthanide, rare-earth, and fluorine chemistry, and for his contributions to nuclear chemistry on the Manhattan Project and later at the Los Alamos National Laboratory.

== Biography ==
Asprey was born in Sioux City, Iowa, on March 19, 1919, the son of Gladys Brown Asprey and Peter Asprey Jr. He had an older sister and a younger brother: mathematician and computer scientist Winifred Asprey, founder of Vassar College's computer science department, and military historian and writer Robert B. Asprey.

Asprey received a B.S. in chemical technology at Iowa State University in 1940, after which he took a job as an industrial chemist with the Campbell's in Chicago. He was drafted into the U.S. Army in 1941, and posted to Fort Warren, Wyoming. He applied for and was accepted into the Army Specialized Training Program, which allowed soldiers to continue their education for a time, and went to Ohio State University to continue his chemistry studies. In January 1944, he was assigned to the Manhattan Project's Special Engineer Detachment, with the rank of technician third grade.

Asprey was posted to the Metallurgical Laboratory (Met Lab) at the University of Chicago, where he joined the effort under Glenn T. Seaborg to devise techniques to separate and purify plutonium. There, with Herbert H. Anderson, he developed the PUREX process (Plutonium–URanium EXtraction); their patent "Solvent Extraction Process for Plutonium" was filed in 1947. He was among the atomic-bomb scientists who signed the Szilárd petition in July 1945 to ask U.S. President Harry S. Truman to exercise extreme care in any decision to use the atomic bomb in the war.

In 1945, Asprey and Winston Manning measured the half-life of the synthetic isotope 95^{242} at about 16 hours; the transient isotope was made by irradiating an early sample of the as-yet-unnamed relatively stable 95^{241} with neutrons. The product after beta decay was yet another new element, 96^{242}. These new unnamed elements created in the Met Lab in Chicago were announced to the world by Glenn Seaborg on November 11, 1945, on the radio show Quiz Kids. Elements 95 and 96, originally called "pandemonium" and "delirium", were eventually named americium and curium by analogy with the chemically related elements europium and gadolinium. Asprey's later discovery, with S. E. Stephanou and Robert A. Penneman at Los Alamos, of the hexapositive, fluoride-soluble oxidation state of americium was one of the keys to the subsequent discovery of element 97, berkelium, at Berkeley, California, in 1949.

While working in Chicago, he met his future wife Margaret (Marge) Williams, who also worked at the Metallurgical Laboratory. They were married at her parents' house in Chicago on May 3, 1944; the Catholic Church did not permit them to marry in a Church, because he was an atheist. They eventually had seven children: Peter Larned, twins Elizabeth (Betty) and Barbara (Barb), Robert Russell (Bobby), Margaret Susan (Peggy), Thomas Arthur (Tom), and William John (Bill). Marge had seven sisters (including one who died in early childhood), and brother Grant R. Williams who died as a Navy test pilot.

Asprey was discharged from the Army in February 1946. He decided to enter the University of California, Berkeley, and get his Ph.D. in chemistry under the supervision of Burris B. Cunningham, whom he had worked for at the Metallurgical Laboratory. He wrote his thesis on "Equilibria in the oxide systems of praseodymium and americium". The Aspreys moved to Los Alamos, New Mexico, in 1949, to work for the Los Alamos National Laboratory, where he spent the rest of his career. He retired in 1986 after conducting more than thirty-five years of research on actinides and lanthanides and related chemistry. He published over 150 peer-reviewed papers and held eight patents. He was the third awardee of the American Chemical Society's Glenn T. Seaborg Actinide Separations Award, in 1986. His wife Marge also worked at Los Alamos, and was recognized for her work by the American Nuclear Society with the Walter H. Zinn Award in 2005, shortly after his death on March 6, 2005, in Mesilla Park, New Mexico.
