= Austrian expedition against Morocco (1829) =

Rescue of Austrian Merchant Vessel

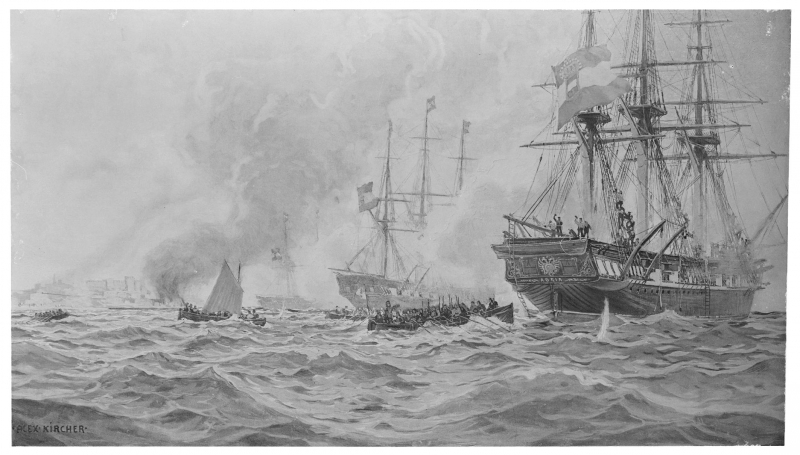
- Battle of an Austrian ship division against Moroccan corsairs (1829), painting by Alexander Kircher.
Date	3 June 1829 – 19 March 1830
Location	Morocco
Result	Austrian victory

Belligerents
(Austrian Empire) Austrian Empire; Supported by : (United Kingdom of Great Britain and Ireland) United Kingdom	Morocco

Commanders and leaders
(Austrian Empire) Franz Bandiera	(Morocco) Abd al-Rahman

Strength
136; 4 warships	2,000; Several warships

Casualties and losses
36	150

The Austrian Expedition against Morocco of 1829 was a successful effort of the Austrian Navy to liberate an Austrian merchant ship and its crew that had been hijacked by Morocco. The expedition resulted in the bombing of several Moroccan ports and ended with a peace treaty that renewed earlier agreements between the two countries.

== Background ==
Austria and Morocco first entered into diplomatic relations in 1783. On 17 April 1783, a friendship and trade treaty was signed in Vienna. As a result of the Peace of Campo Formio, Austria annexed the Republic of Venice in 1797, thereby gaining a significant increase in its merchant fleet. In order to protect itself against Moroccan corsairs, Venice had paid tribute to Morocco since 1765. Austria stopped these payments. In 1803, Sultan Moulay Slimane of Morocco issued orders to Rais Ibrahim Lubaris to seize vessels belonging to the United States of America, Venice, Holland, the northern German States and all countries which had no peace treaties with Morocco. The Austrian ambassador Charles-Marie Mogniat de Pouilly managed to renew the friendship and trade treaty with the Moroccan sultan in November 1805. The ambassador also reported that the Moroccan fleet at that time comprised approximately twenty vessels, all of which were poorly constructed.

In 1825 two Austrian vessels were attacked by Moroccan corsairs. In 1827 the Sultan Moulay Abd al-Rahman authorized the captains of Rabat and Salé to take to the sea and pursue the tradition of the Jihad along the coasts of Morocco and its European neighbors. The corsairing fleet captured some British ships — which were soon returned — in 1828. One of those fleet ships succeeded in forcing some of the ships of Austria into the port of the Bou Regreg.

The trade and shipping treaty between Brazil and Austria, signed in 1827, led to lively trade between the two states. On the voyage from Trieste to Rio de Janeiro in the summer of 1828, the Austrian commercial brigantine Veloce was taken off Cádiz by the Moroccan brig Rabia-el-Gheir and taken to Rabat. Under the command of Korvettenkapitän Franz Bandiera an Austrian fleet of four ships sailed, the corvettes Carolina (26 guns), Adria (20 guns), the brig Veneto and the schooner Enrichetta, to Gibraltar. Due to difficult weather conditions, the goal could not be reached until January 1829. Negotiations then began in Gibraltar between the Austrian ambassador Wilhelm von Pflügl, who had accompanied the fleet, and the Moroccan consul general Judah Benoliel.

== Expedition ==
Although the 13-man team was released and an apology was obtained from the Moroccan government - which asserted that this action had not been authorized by them - the handover of the Veloce and the payment of compensation were refused. Bandiera then had Moroccan ports blocked. With the Carolina, the Adria and the Veneto he had the city Larache bombed on 3 June 1829, and a landing party (commanded by Paul Zimburg von Reinerz) of 136 men land in the harbour to sink the two anchored Moroccan brigs. The Moroccan ships could be set on fire unopposed using missiles, but fighting broke out on retreat. The Austrians lost 22 dead and 14 wounded, and the Moroccans about 150 men. The cities of Asilah and Tétouan were also bombed.

== Peace treaty ==
In January 1830, the Moroccan government signalled its willingness to negotiate, as a result of which a pre-peace treaty was signed between Austria and Morocco in Gibraltar on 2 February 1830. On 19 March 1830, the peace and trade treaty of 1783 and 1805 was renewed and the Veloce was delivered to the Austrians.

== Bibliography ==
- Abitbol, Michel (2014). Histoire du Maroc [History of Morocco] (in French). Paris: EDI8. ISBN 978-2-262-03816-8. OCLC 1153447202.
- Brown, Kenneth L. (1976). People of Salé: Tradition and Change in a Moroccan City, 1830-1930. Manchester University Press. ISBN 0719006236.
- El Mansour, Mohamed (1981). Political and Social Developments in Morocco During the Reign of Mawlay Sulayman 1792-1822 (PDF). University of London, School of Oriental and African Studies.
- Pennell, C. R. (2000). Morocco Since 1830: A History. Hurst. ISBN 978-1-85065-273-1.
