= Robert B. Asprey =

American military historian and author

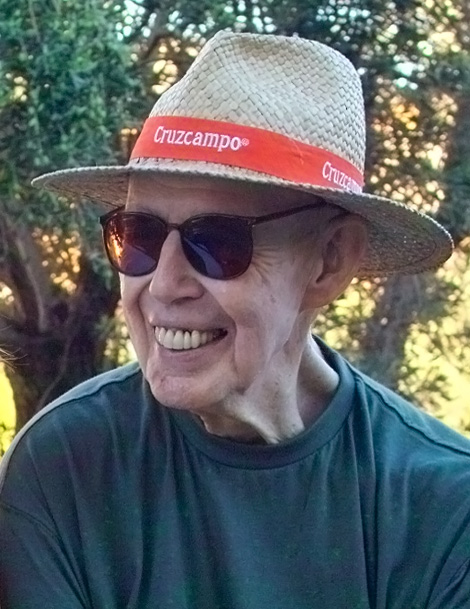
- Asprey at his home in Spain in 2003
- Born: Robert Brown Asprey; February 16, 1923} Sioux City, Iowa, US
- Died: January 26, 2009 (aged 85); Sarasota, FL, USA
- Education: University of Iowa (BA); Oxford University; University of Vienna; University of Nice
- Occupations: author, military historian
- Years active: 1959-2001
- Relatives: Larned B. Asprey (brother); Winifred Asprey (sister)
Military Service
- Branch: United States Marine Corps; Marine Beach Jumper Unit; 5th Marine Division; United States Army; US Army Intelligence
- Rank: captain
- Conflicts: World War II; Korean War
- Awards: Purple Heart

Robert Brown Asprey (February 16, 1923 – January 26, 2009) was an American military historian and author, noted for his books on military history published between 1959 and 2001.

== Biography ==
Robert Brown Asprey was born in Sioux City, Iowa, to Gladys (née) Brown) and Peter Asprey Jr. He had an older brother and sister. His brother, Larned B. Asprey (1919–2005), was an actinide and fluorine chemist and signer of the Szilárd petition. His sister, Winifred Asprey (1917–2007), a mathematician and computer scientist, was the founder of Vassar College's computer science department.

In World War II, Asprey was a member of the secret Marine Beach Jumper Unit, then joined the 5th Marine Division.

In 1949, Asprey received his BA (honors) in English and modern history from the University of Iowa. From 1949 to 1950, he was a Fulbright Scholar at New College, University of Oxford. From 1955 to 1957, he studied at the University of Vienna. From 1968 to 1972, he was a researcher at New College. In 1974, he attended the University of Nice in Nice, on the French Riviera.

In the 1950s, he served in U.S. Army Intelligence in Austria before returning to the Marine Corps in the Korean War with the rank of captain. He received a Purple Heart and a Presidential Unit Citation for his service.

In 2004, he moved from Spain to Sarasota, Florida. From 2005, he was a research scholar at New College of Florida. He died in January 2009.

== War in the Shadows: The Guerrilla in History ==
Perhaps Asprey's most famous book is the monumental War in the Shadows: The Guerrilla in History, a sweeping 2500-year survey on the subject, with particular emphasis on the Vietnam War and the other guerrilla wars of the 20th century, including the underground actions that took place during conventional wars, from T. E. Lawrence of Arabia in World War I to Mao Zedong before, during, and after World War II .

Originally released in two volumes in 1975, the book was revised and abridged in 1994 as a single-volume second edition. Chapters were added later covering the end of the Vietnam War and other guerrilla conflicts since the book's original version.

== Works ==
- The Panther's Feast (1959)
- Once a Marine (1964) with A.A. Vandegrift
- At Belleau Wood (1965)
- Semper Fidelis: The U.S. Marines in World War II (1967)
- War In The Shadows: The Guerrilla in History (1975)
- Operation Prophet (1977)
- The First Battle of the Marne (1962)
- Frederick the Great: The Magnificent Enigma (1986)
- The German High Command at War: Hindenburg and Ludendorff Conduct World War I (1991)
- Rise of Napoleon Bonaparte (2001)
  - UK: The Rise and Fall of Napoleon, Volume I: The Rise (2000)
- Reign of Napoleon Bonaparte (2001)
  - UK: The Rise and Fall of Napoleon, Volume II: The Fall (2001)
