= Silesian Wars =

18th-century wars between Prussia and Austria

- Part of the Austro-Prussian rivalry
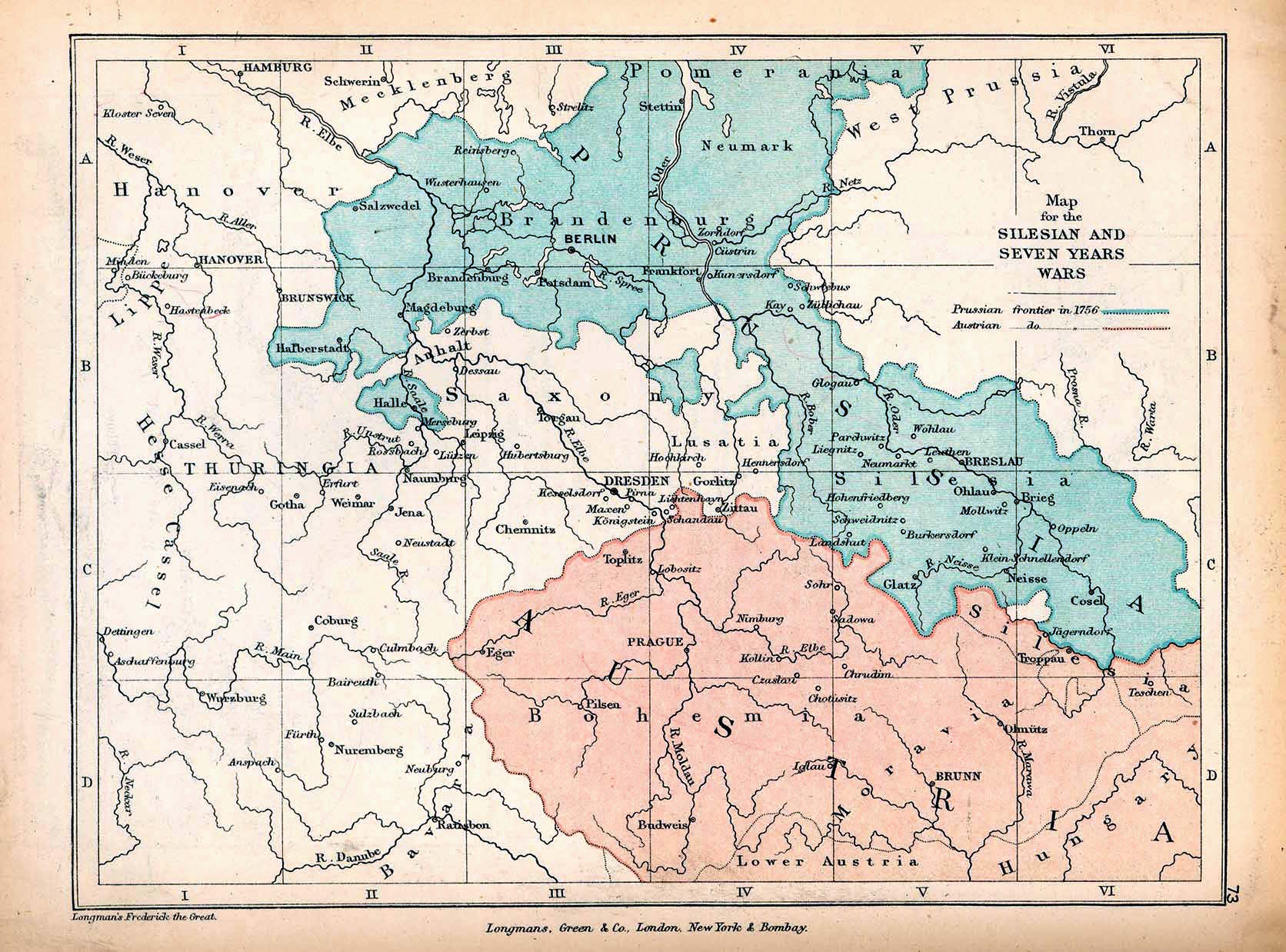
- The Central European borders of Brandenburg–Prussia (blue-green) and the Habsburg monarchy (red) in 1756, after Prussia's seizure of Silesia in the First Silesian War
| Date | 16 December 1740 – 15 February 1763 |
| Location | Central Europe |
| Result | Prussian victory |
| Territorial changes | Habsburg monarchy cedes the majority of Silesia to Prussia. |

Belligerents
| Prussia | Habsburg monarchy Saxony (Second & Third); Russia (Third); France (Third) |

Commanders and leaders
| (Kingdom of Prussia) Frederick the Great (Kingdom of Prussia) Prince Henry | (Habsburg monarchy) Archduchess Maria Theresa (Electorate of Saxony) Prince-Elector Frederick Augustus II (Russian Empire) Empress Elizabeth (Kingdom of France) King Louis XV |

The Silesian Wars (German: Schlesische Kriege) were three wars fought in the mid-18th century between Prussia, under King Frederick the Great, and Habsburg Austria, under Empress Maria Theresa, for control of the Central European region of Silesia, now in south-western Poland.

The First (1740–1742) and Second (1744–1745) Silesian Wars formed parts of the wider War of the Austrian Succession, in which Prussia was a member of a coalition seeking territorial gain at Austria's expense. The Third Silesian War (1756–1763) was a theatre of the global Seven Years' War, in which Austria in turn led a coalition of powers aiming to seize Prussian territory.

No particular event triggered the wars. Prussia cited its centuries-old dynastic claims on parts of Silesia as a casus belli, but Realpolitik and geostrategic factors also played a role in provoking the conflict. Maria Theresa's contested succession to the Habsburg monarchy under the Pragmatic Sanction of 1713 provided an opportunity for Prussia to strengthen itself relative to regional rivals such as Saxony and Bavaria.

All three wars are generally considered to have ended in Prussian victories, and the first resulted in Austria's cession of the majority of Silesia to Prussia. Prussia emerged from the Silesian Wars as a new European great power and the leading state of Protestant Germany, while Catholic Austria's defeat by a lesser German power significantly damaged the House of Habsburg's prestige. The conflict over Silesia foreshadowed a wider Austro-Prussian struggle for hegemony over the German-speaking peoples, which would later culminate in the Austro-Prussian War of 1866.

== Context and causes ==
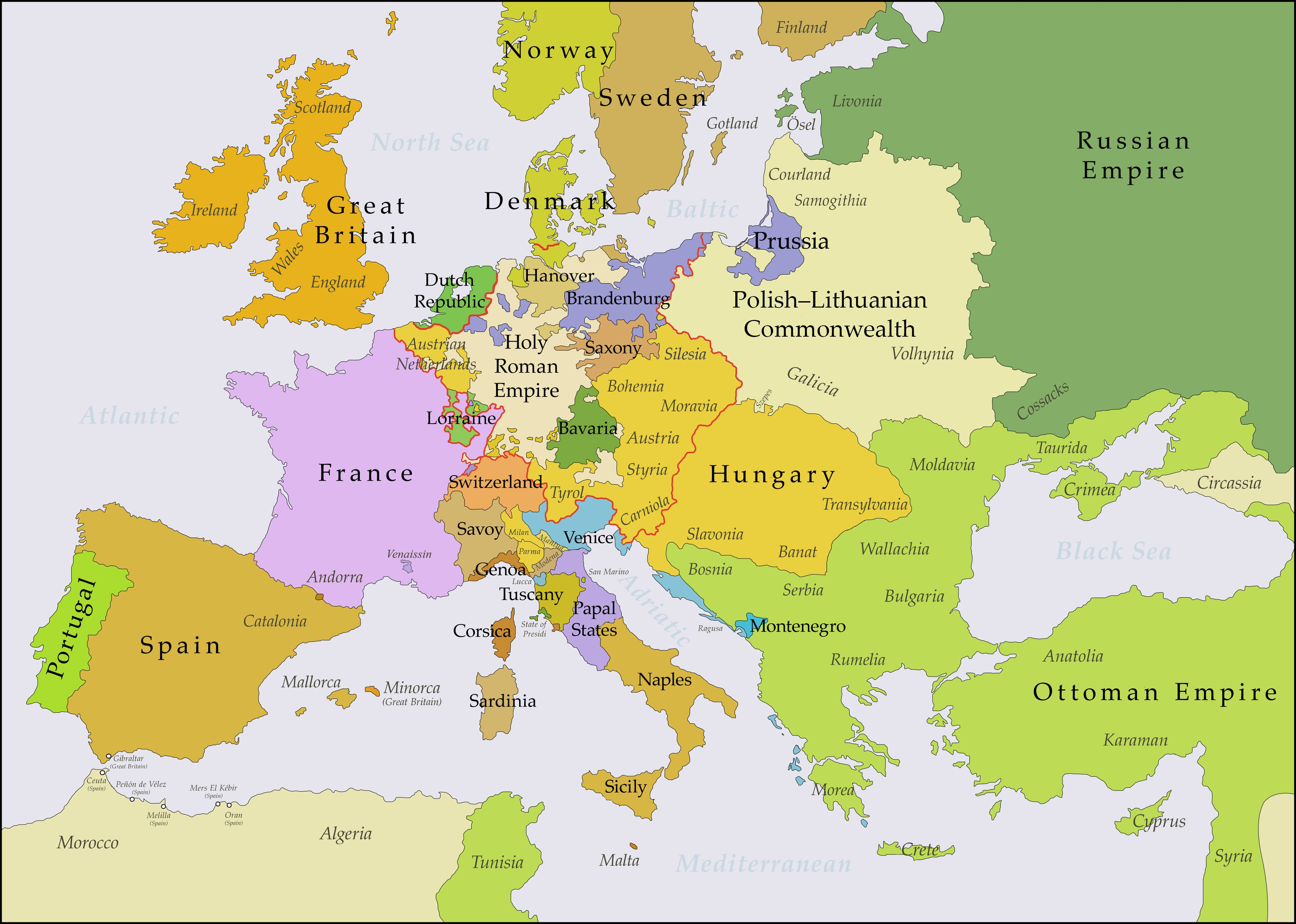
Europe in the years after the Treaty of Vienna (1738) and before the First Silesian War, with Prussia in violet and the Habsburg monarchy in gold

In the early 18th century the Kingdom of Prussia's ruling House of Hohenzollern held dynastic claims to several duchies within the Habsburg province of Silesia, a populous and prosperous region contiguous with Prussia's core territory in the Margraviate of Brandenburg. Besides its value as a source of tax revenue, industrial output and military recruits, Silesia held great geostrategic importance to multiple parties. The valley of the Upper Oder formed a natural military conduit between Brandenburg, the Kingdom of Bohemia and the Margraviate of Moravia, and whichever power held the territory could threaten its neighbours. Silesia also lay along the north-eastern frontier of the Holy Roman Empire, allowing its controller to limit the influence of the Polish–Lithuanian Commonwealth and of the Russian Empire within Germany.

=== Prussia's claims ===
Prussia's claims in Silesia were based, in part, on a 1537 inheritance treaty between the Silesian Piast Duke Frederick II of Legnica and the Hohenzollern Prince-Elector Joachim II Hector of Brandenburg, whereby the Silesian Duchies of Liegnitz, Wohlau and Brieg were to pass to the Hohenzollerns of Brandenburg should the Piast dynasty in Silesia become extinct. At the time, the Habsburg King Ferdinand I of Bohemia (Silesia's feudal overlord) rejected the agreement and pressed the Hohenzollerns to repudiate it. In 1603, Hohenzollern Elector Joachim III Frederick of Brandenburg separately inherited the Silesian Duchy of Jägerndorf from his cousin, Margrave George Frederick of Brandenburg-Ansbach, and installed his second son, Johann Georg, as duke.

In the 1618 Bohemian Revolt and the ensuing Thirty Years' War, Johann Georg joined the Silesian estates in revolt against the Catholic Holy Roman Emperor Ferdinand II. After the Catholic victory in the 1621 Battle of White Mountain, the Emperor confiscated Johann Georg's duchy and refused to return it to his heirs after his death, but the Hohenzollerns of Brandenburg continued to assert themselves as the legitimate rulers of Jägerndorf. In 1675 the "Great Elector" Frederick William laid claim to Liegnitz, Wohlau and Brieg when the Silesian Piast line ended with the death of Duke George William of Liegnitz, but the Habsburg Emperor disregarded the Hohenzollern claims, and the lands escheated to the Bohemian crown.

In 1685, when Austria was engaged in the Great Turkish War, Emperor Leopold I gave Great Elector Frederick William immediate control of the Silesian exclave of Schwiebus in return for military support against the Turks and the surrender of the outstanding Hohenzollern claims in Silesia. After the accession of the Great Elector's son and successor, Frederick III of Brandenburg, the Emperor took back control of Schwiebus in 1694, claiming that the territory had only been personally assigned to the late Great Elector for life. As a young prince, Frederick III had secretly agreed to this repossession in return for Leopold's payment of some of his debts, but as monarch he repudiated the agreement and reasserted the old Hohenzollern claims to Jägerndorf and the Silesian Piast heritage.

=== Austrian succession ===
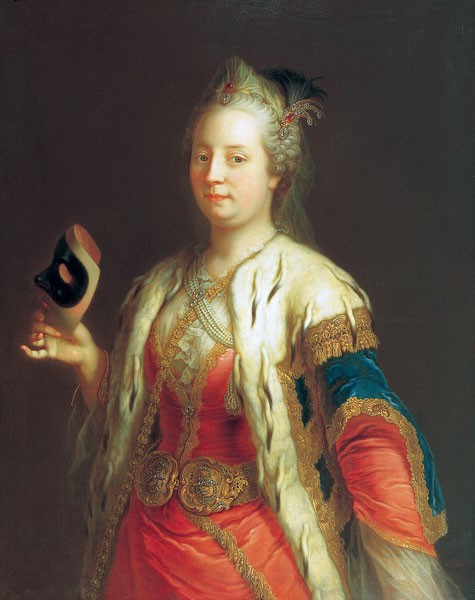
Maria Theresa of Austria c. 1744, by Martin van Meytens

Two generations later, the newly crowned Hohenzollern King Frederick II of Prussia formed designs on Silesia soon after succeeding to the throne in May 1740. Frederick judged that his dynasty's claims were credible, and he had inherited from his father a large and well trained Prussian army and a healthy royal treasury. Austria was in financial distress, and its army had not been reinforced or reformed after an ignominious performance in the 1737–1739 Austro-Turkish War. The European strategic situation was favourable for an attack on Austria, as Britain and France were occupying each other's attentions in the War of Jenkins' Ear, and Sweden was moving toward war with Russia. The Electors of Bavaria and Saxony also had claims against Austria and seemed likely to join in the attack. Though the Hohenzollerns' dynastic claims provided a legalistic casus belli, considerations of Realpolitik and geostrategy played the leading role in provoking the war.

An opportunity arose for Brandenburg–Prussia to press its claims when Habsburg Holy Roman Emperor Charles VI died in October 1740 without a male heir. With the Pragmatic Sanction of 1713, Charles had established his eldest daughter, Maria Theresa, as the successor to his hereditary titles. Upon his death she duly became ruler of Austria, as well as of the Bohemian and Hungarian lands within the Habsburg monarchy. During Emperor Charles's lifetime the Pragmatic Sanction was generally acknowledged by the imperial estates, but when he died it was promptly contested by Prussia, Bavaria and Saxony.

=== Moves toward war ===
Frederick saw in Austria's female succession an opportune moment for the seizure of Silesia, calling it "the signal for the complete transformation of the old political system" in a 1740 letter to Voltaire. He argued that the Pragmatic Sanction did not apply to Silesia, which was held by the Habsburgs as a part of the imperial demesne rather than as a hereditary possession. Frederick also argued that his father, King Frederick William I, had assented to the Sanction in return for assurances of Austrian support for Hohenzollern claims on the Rhenish Duchies of Jülich and Berg, which had not yet materialised.

Meanwhile, Prince-Elector Charles Albert of Bavaria and Prince-Elector Frederick Augustus II of Saxony had each married one of Maria Theresa's older cousins from a senior branch of the House of Habsburg, and they used these connections to justify claims to Habsburg territory in the absence of a male heir. Frederick Augustus, who ruled the Poland-Lithuanian Commonwealth in personal union, was especially interested in gaining control of Silesia to connect his two realms into one contiguous territory (which would nearly surround Brandenburg); Frederick's concern to prevent this outcome contributed to his haste in moving against Austria when the contested succession provided an opportunity.

=== Methods and technologies ===
European warfare in the early modern period was characterised by the widespread adoption of firearms in combination with more traditional bladed weapons. Eighteenth-century European armies were built around units of massed infantry armed with smoothbore flintlock muskets and bayonets. Cavalrymen were equipped with sabres and pistols or carbines; light cavalry were used principally for reconnaissance, screening and tactical communications, while heavy cavalry were used as tactical reserves and deployed for shock attacks. Smoothbore artillery provided fire support and played the leading role in siege warfare. Strategic warfare in this period centred around control of key fortifications positioned so as to command the surrounding regions and roads, lengthy sieges being a common feature of armed conflict. Decisive field battles were relatively rare, though they played a larger part in Frederick's theory of warfare than was typical among his contemporary rivals.

The Silesian Wars, like most European wars of the 18th century, were fought as so-called cabinet wars in which disciplined regular armies were equipped and supplied by the state to conduct warfare on behalf of the sovereign's interests. Occupied enemy territories were regularly taxed and extorted for funds, but large-scale atrocities against civilian populations were rare compared with conflicts in the previous century. Military logistics was the decisive factor in many wars, as armies had grown too large to support themselves on prolonged campaigns by foraging and plunder alone. Military supplies were stored in centralised magazines and distributed by baggage trains that were highly vulnerable to enemy raids. Armies were generally unable to sustain combat operations during winter and normally established winter quarters in the cold season, resuming their campaigns with the return of spring.

== First Silesian War ==
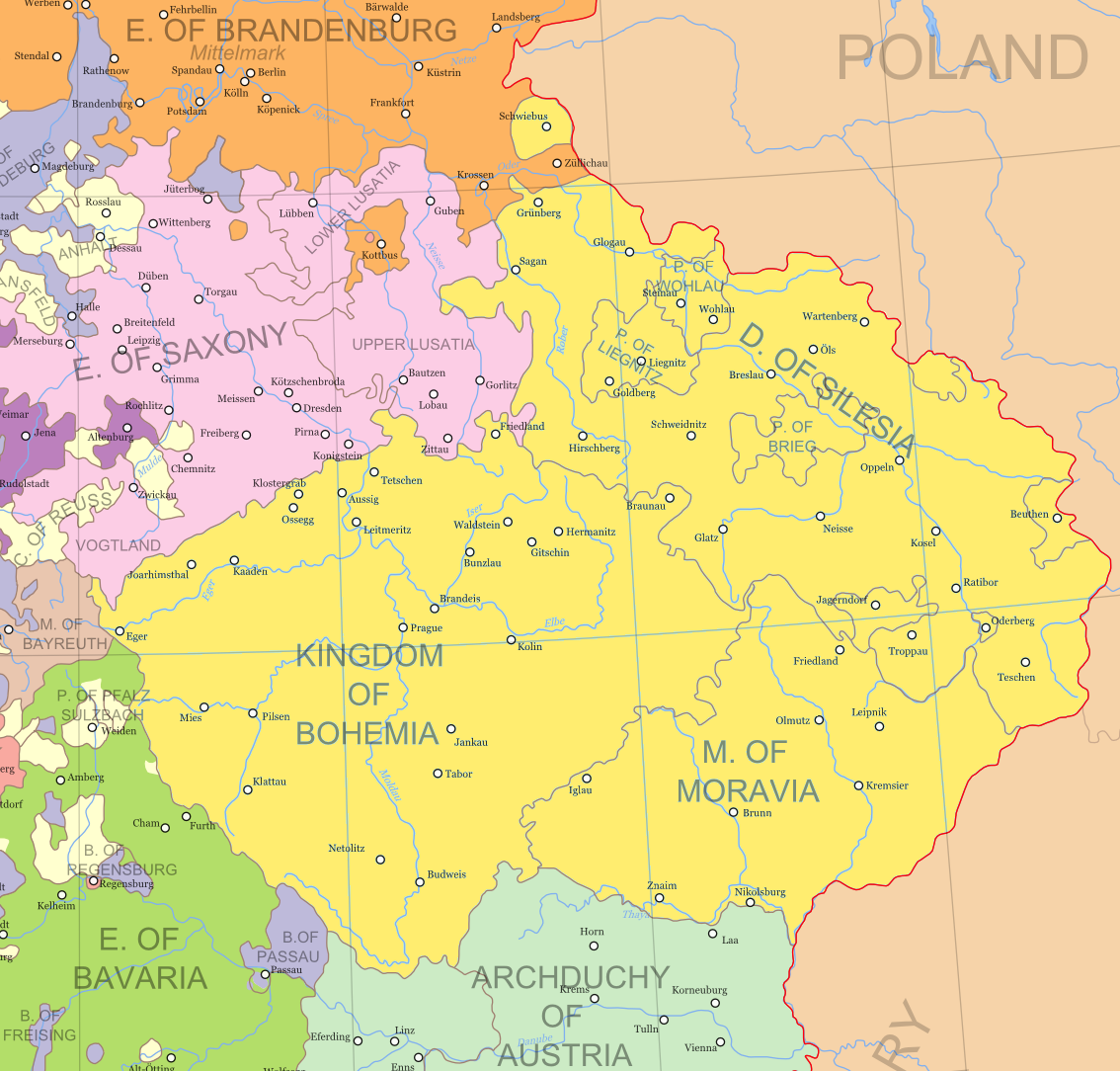
The Lands of the Bohemian Crown under Habsburg rule until 1742, when most of Silesia was ceded to Brandenburg–Prussia

After Emperor Charles's death on 20 October 1740, Frederick quickly resolved to strike first; on 8 November he ordered the mobilisation of the Prussian army, and on 11 December he issued an ultimatum to Maria Theresa demanding the cession of Silesia. In return, he offered to guarantee all other Habsburg possessions against any attack, pay a large cash indemnity, acknowledge the Pragmatic Sanction, and give his vote as elector of Brandenburg to Maria Theresa's husband, Duke Francis Stephen of Lorraine, in the forthcoming imperial election to replace the deceased Charles.

Not waiting for a response and without a declaration of war, he led Prussian troops across the lightly defended Silesian frontier on 16 December, beginning the First Silesian War. By the end of January 1741 almost the entirety of Silesia was under Prussian control, and the remaining Austrian strongholds of Glogau, Brieg and Neisse were besieged. In late March an Austrian force relieved the siege of Neisse, but the main Prussian force engaged and defeated it in the Battle of Mollwitz on 10 April, securing Prussian control of the region.

Seeing Austria's defeat at Mollwitz, other powers were emboldened to attack the beleaguered monarchy, widening the conflict into what would become the War of the Austrian Succession. As Bavaria, Saxony, France, Naples and Spain attacked Austria on multiple fronts during the succeeding months, Frederick began secret peace negotiations with Maria Theresa, with British urging and mediation; on 9 October Austria and Prussia agreed to a secret armistice known as the Convention of Klein Schnellendorf, under which Austria committed to eventually concede Lower Silesia in return for peace.

As Austria concentrated its forces against its other enemies and gained ground in the wider war, Frederick concluded that the Austrians did not intend to honour the Convention and concede territory in Silesia. To press Austria further, he repudiated the armistice and renewed offensive operations of his own. In December 1741 Prussian forces advanced into Moravia, occupying the capital at Olmütz, and besieged the fortress at Glatz on the edge of Bohemia. In January 1742 Elector Charles Albert of Bavaria won the 1742 Imperial election and became Holy Roman Emperor. In February Frederick organised a joint advance through Moravia toward Vienna with the Saxons and French, but Prussia's allies were reluctant and uncooperative, and the campaign was abandoned in April, after which the Prussians withdrew into Bohemia and Upper Silesia.

An Austrian counter-advance into Bohemia engaged Frederick's Prussians on 17 May and was narrowly defeated at the resulting Battle of Chotusitz. This defeat left Austria with no immediate means of driving its enemies out of Bohemia, and renewed peace talks with Prussia began in Breslau. Under British pressure, Austria agreed to cede to Prussia the large majority of Silesia, along with the County of Glatz in Bohemia, while Austria would retain two small portions of the extreme southern end of Silesia, including the Duchy of Teschen and parts of the Duchies of Jägerndorf, Troppau and Neisse. Prussia also agreed to take on some of Austria's debts and to remain neutral for the remainder of the ongoing war. This peace agreement was adopted with the Treaty of Breslau, which ended the First Silesian War on 11 June 1742, and was later formalised in the Treaty of Berlin.

== Second Silesian War ==
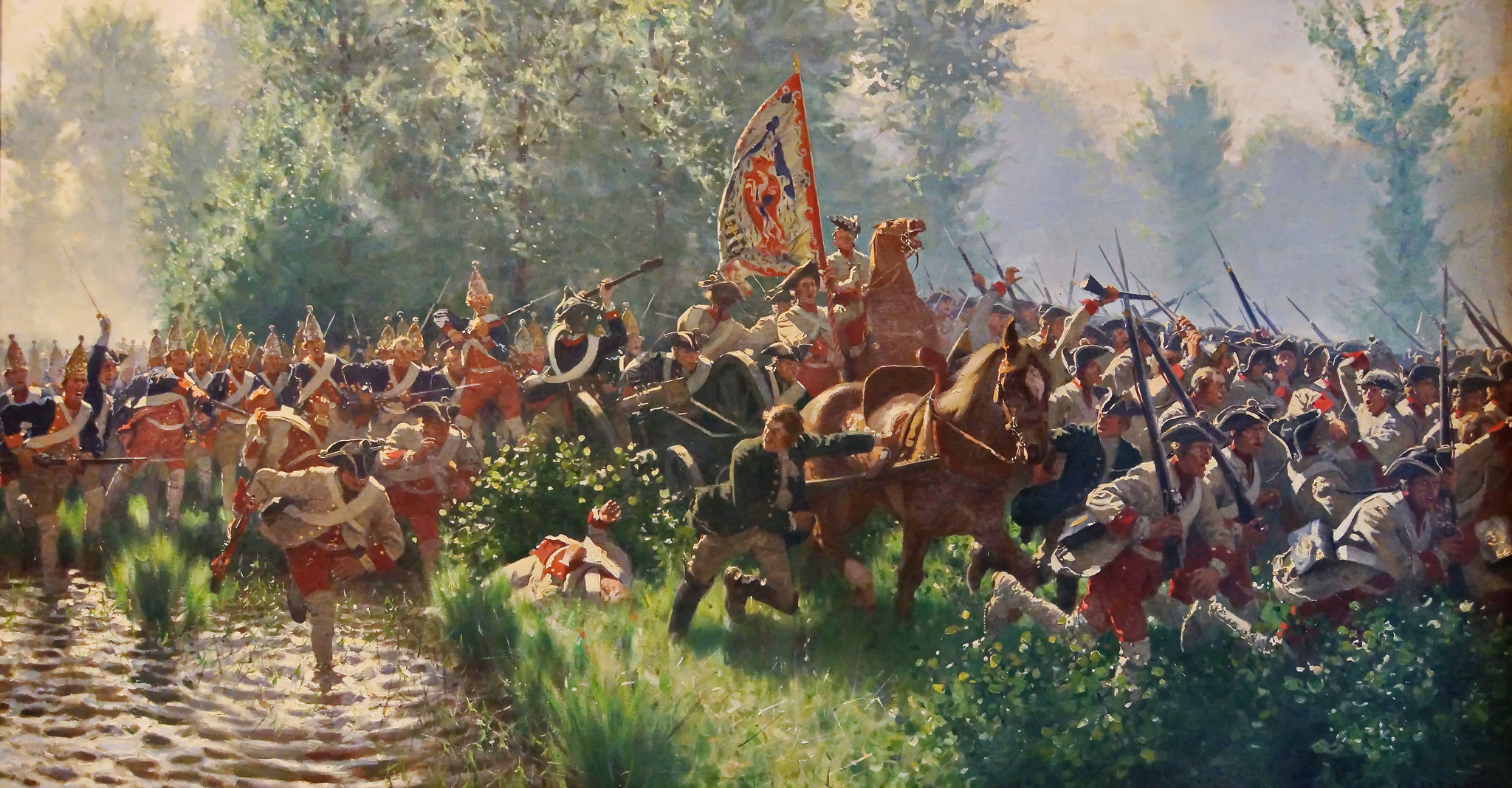
Prussian grenadiers overrunning Saxon forces during the Battle of Hohenfriedberg, as depicted by Carl Röchling

Peace with Prussia allowed the Austrians and their British–Hanoverian allies to reverse the gains made by the French and Bavarians in 1741. By mid 1743 Austria recovered control of Bohemia, drove the French back across the Rhine, and occupied Bavaria. In September 1743 Britain, Austria and Savoy–Sardinia concluded a new alliance under the Treaty of Worms, which led Frederick to suspect that Maria Theresa meant to retake Silesia as soon as the war elsewhere was concluded. So, on 7 August 1744 Prussia declared its intervention in the ongoing conflict on behalf of Emperor Charles Albert, and Frederick led soldiers across the frontier into Bohemia on 15 August, beginning the Second Silesian War.

Prussian forces converged upon Prague, seizing the city on 16 September, and this new threat drew the Austrian army back from France through Bavaria. The French failed to harass and disrupt the Austrian redeployment, so Austria's army was able to return to Bohemia quickly and at full strength. Frederick gathered his forces around Prague and tried to force a decisive engagement, but Austrian commander Otto Ferdinand von Traun focused on harassing the invaders' supply lines, eventually forcing the Prussians to abandon Bohemia and retreat into Upper Silesia in November.

With the January 1745 Treaty of Warsaw, Austria established a new "Quadruple Alliance" between Austria, Britain, Saxony and the Dutch Republic. Meanwhile, Emperor Charles Albert died on 20 January, destroying the rationale behind Frederick's alliance. Austria renewed its offensive against Bavaria in March 1745, decisively defeating the Franco-Bavarian army at the 15 April Battle of Pfaffenhofen, and making peace with Maximilian III of Bavaria (the son of the late Emperor Charles Albert) by the Treaty of Füssen on 22 April.

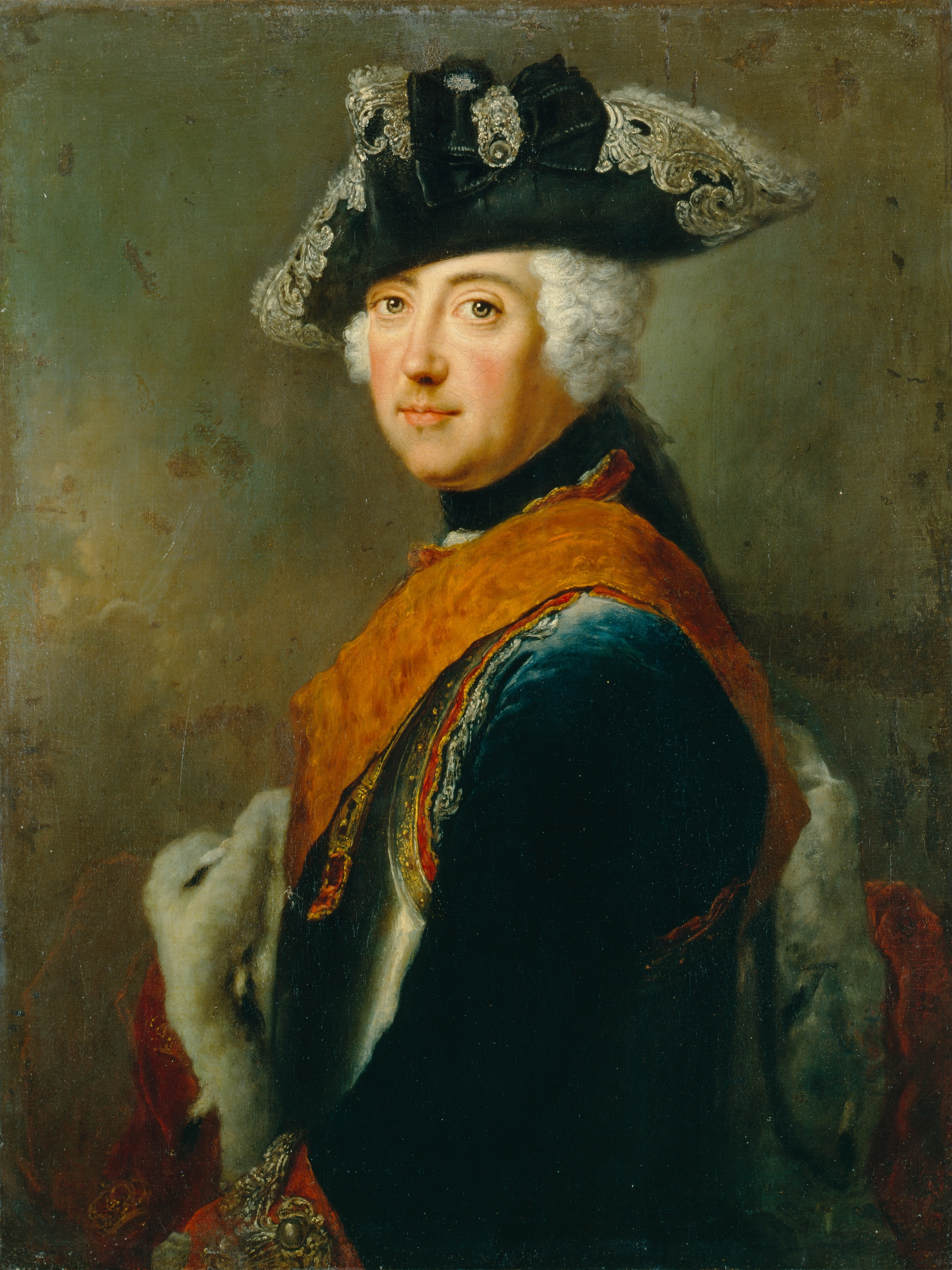
Frederick the Great of Prussia in 1745, by Antoine Pesne

Having defeated Bavaria, Austria began an invasion of Silesia. At the end of May an Austrian–Saxon army crossed through the Giant Mountains into Silesia, only to be surprised and decisively defeated by Frederick in the Battle of Hohenfriedberg on 4 June, removing any immediate prospect of Austria recovering Silesia. The Prussians followed the retreating Austrian–Saxon army into Bohemia, encamping along the Elbe while Frederick pursued a peace agreement. During the following months Maria Theresa won the support of enough prince-electors to see her husband named Holy Roman Emperor Francis I on 13 September in Frankfurt, achieving one of her major goals in the war.

On 29 September the Austrians attacked Frederick's camp in Bohemia, resulting in a Prussian victory at the Battle of Soor, despite the Austrian surprise and superior numbers. Soon low supplies forced the Prussians to withdraw into Upper Silesia for the winter. In November Austria and Saxony prepared a surprise double invasion of Brandenburg, hoping to seize Berlin and end the war outright. On 23 November Frederick surprised the Austrian invaders in the Battle of Hennersdorf, confusing and scattering the larger Austrian force. Meanwhile, another Prussian army under Leopold I of Anhalt-Dessau advanced into western Saxony, attacking and destroying the main Saxon army in the Battle of Kesselsdorf on 15 December, after which the Prussians occupied Dresden.

In Dresden the belligerents quickly negotiated a peace treaty, under which Maria Theresa acknowledged Prussian control of Silesia and Glatz, while Frederick recognised Francis I as Holy Roman Emperor and again committed to neutrality for the remainder of the War of the Austrian Succession. For its part in the Austrian alliance, Saxony was compelled to pay one million rixdollars in reparations to Prussia. The region's borders were thus confirmed at the status quo ante bellum, which had been Prussia's principal goal. This Treaty of Dresden was signed on 25 December 1745, ending the Second Silesian War between Austria, Saxony and Prussia.

== Interbellum ==
After Prussia's withdrawal the wider War of the Austrian Succession continued for another two years, ending with the Treaty of Aix-la-Chapelle in 1748. Despite the commitments made under the Treaty of Dresden, Maria Theresa still refused to give the Holy Roman Empire's recognition of Prussia's sovereignty in Silesia, and Frederick in turn still declined to recognise Maria Theresa's legitimacy as sovereign in the Bohemian lands under the Pragmatic Sanction. The underlying conflict over Silesia was unresolved, and both sides spent the years of peace making preparations for renewed conflict.

Prussia built and expanded fortifications at strategic points in Silesia, and the army began to reequip its artillery units with heavier guns. The crown established Prussia's first central bank, and the treasury gathered its surpluses into a growing war chest throughout the peace. In diplomacy, Frederick worked to maintain Prussia's alliance with France while easing British concerns over the security of the Electorate of Hanover, which British King George II also ruled in personal union. By these means, and by avoiding any provocations toward Russia, he hoped to manage the Austrian threat and preserve the balance of power.

After the Treaty of Dresden, Maria Theresa initiated a wave of so-called Theresian reforms of Austria's administration and military, as well as ordering a review of her government's diplomatic policy. Her Chancellor Friedrich Wilhelm von Haugwitz oversaw a dramatic reform of the realm's systems of taxation, which funded a significant expansion of Austria's field armies. Field Marshal Leopold Joseph von Daun standardised the army's equipment and professionalised its training, drawing on the Prussian model. In 1746 Maria Theresa entered a defensive pact with Empress Elizabeth of Russia that aligned their two realms against Prussia. Beginning in 1753 Foreign Minister Wenzel Anton von Kaunitz pursued warmer relations with Austria's traditional rival, the Kingdom of France. In 1756 these efforts led Austria to abandon its alliance with Britain in favour of a new Franco-Austrian alliance, while Prussia and Britain entered a defensive alliance by the Convention of Westminster, completing a diplomatic reordering of the European powers known as the Diplomatic Revolution.

== Third Silesian War ==
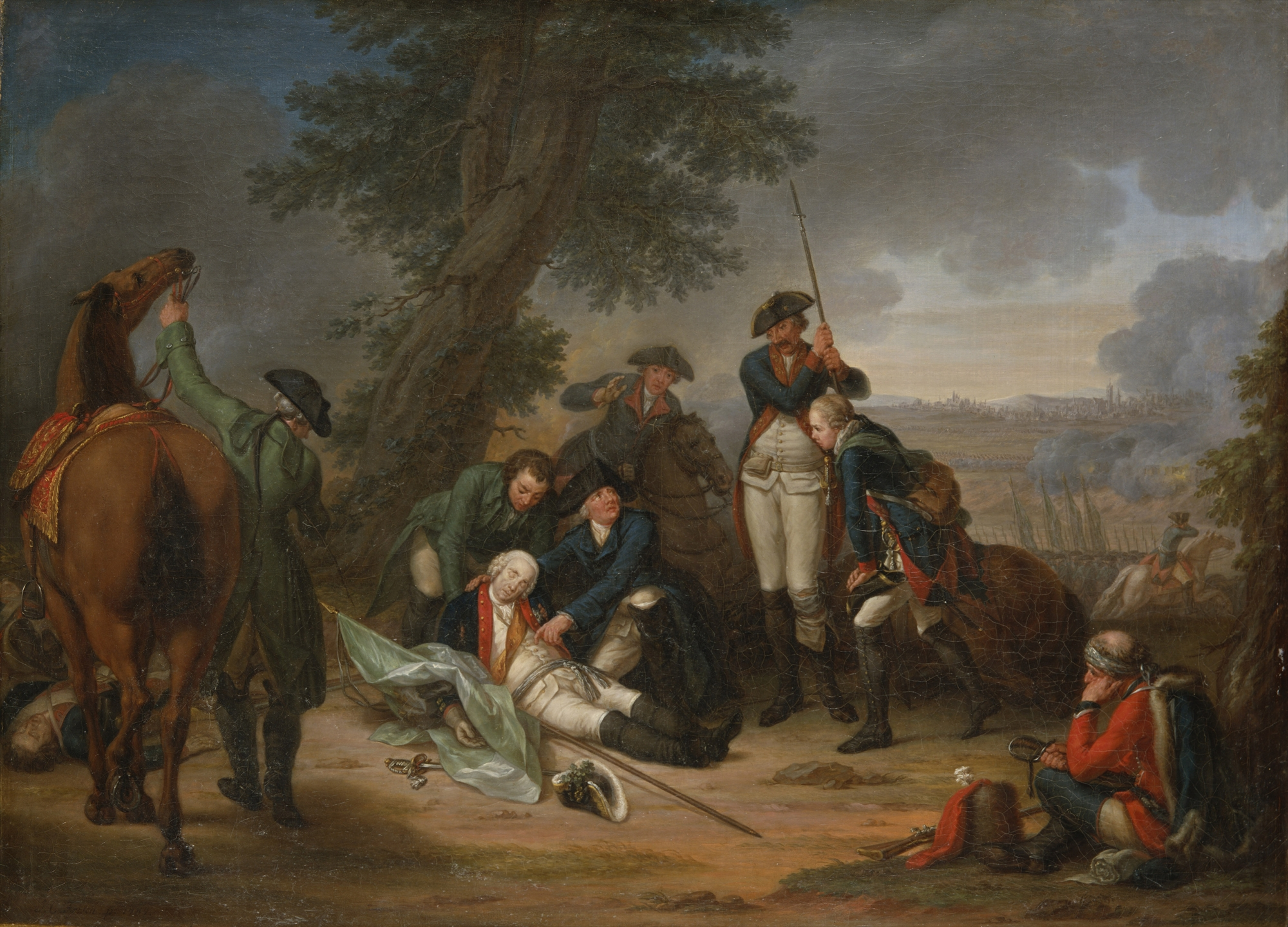
Prussian Field Marshal Kurt von Schwerin dying of wounds at the Battle of Prague, as depicted by Johann Christoph Frisch

As Austria, France and Russia formed a new anti-Prussian coalition, Frederick became convinced that Prussia would be attacked in early 1757 and once again chose to strike first. On 29 August 1756 he preemptively invaded neighbouring Saxony, beginning the Third Silesian War. As Austria's and Prussia's allies joined the fighting, the conflict quickly widened into what became the pan-European Seven Years' War. The Prussians occupied Saxony in late 1756 and made large advances in Bohemia in early 1757, winning a series of battles while advancing to Prague. In May Prussian forces drove back the Austrian defenders in the Battle of Prague, taking great losses, and then besieged the city. An Austrian counter-attack culminated in the major Austrian victory at the Battle of Kolín on 18 June, which drove the Prussians out of Bohemia entirely. Meanwhile, Russian and Swedish invasions from the east and north divided Prussia's forces. The Russian invaders in East Prussia won the Battle of Gross-Jägersdorf on 30 August, but they made little strategic progress due to recurring logistical problems.

In late 1757 Imperial and French forces attempted to retake Saxony from the west, only to experience a decisive defeat in the Battle of Rossbach on 5 November. This battle secured Prussia's control of Saxony for a time, and the defeat greatly reduced French willingness to contribute further to the Silesian War. Another Austrian army invaded Silesia, making significant progress until it was decisively defeated at the Battle of Leuthen on 5 December, after which the Prussians pursued the defeated Austrian army back to Bohemia and recovered control of nearly all of Silesia. Over the winter a combined Prussian-Hanoverian army launched a series of offensives that eventually drove the French out of Westphalia and across the Rhine, securing Prussia's western flank for the duration of the war.

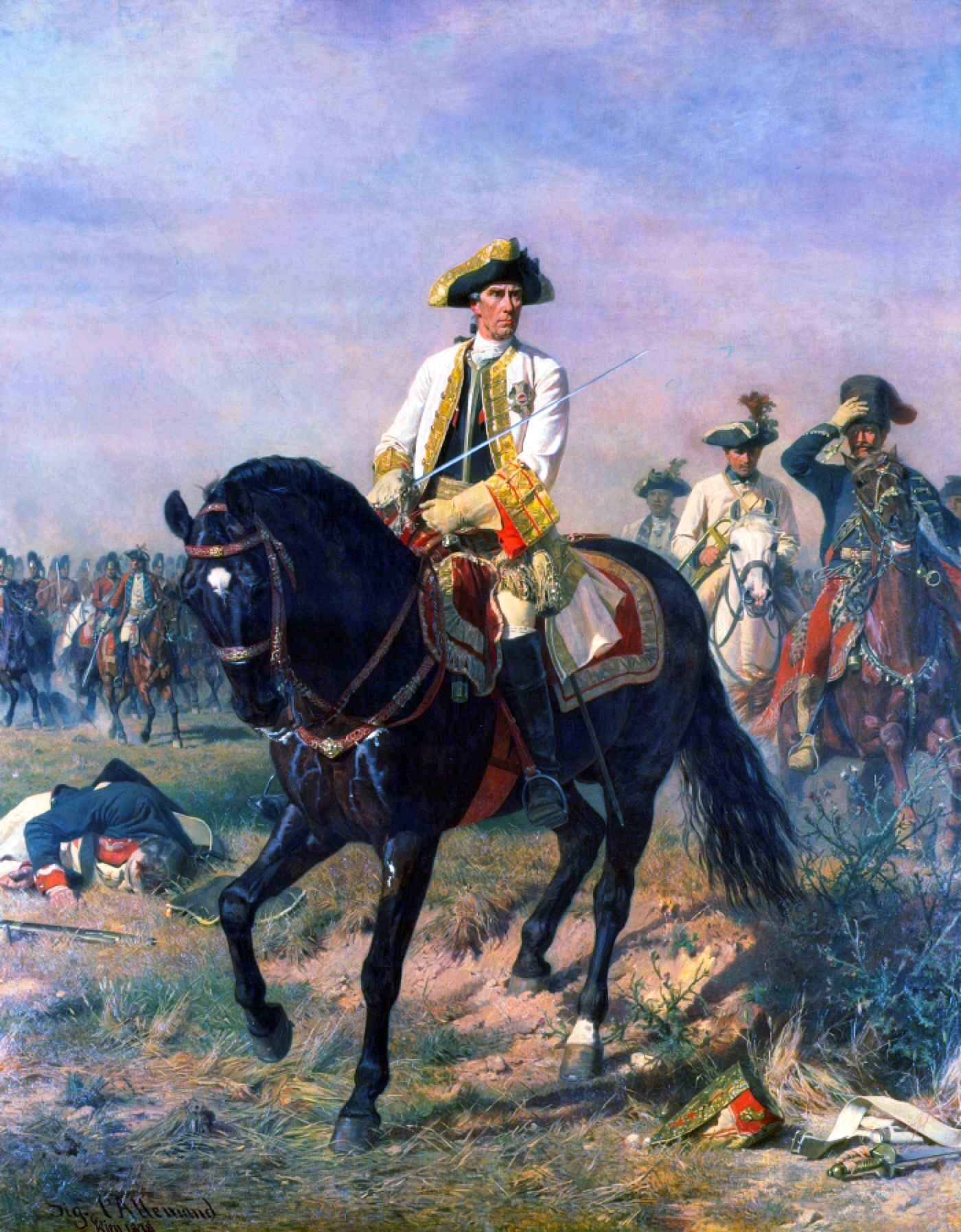
Austrian commander Ernst von Laudon surveying the 1759 Battle of Kunersdorf, where the Russian and Austrian forces combined to defeat the Prussians, as depicted by Siegmund L'Allemand

In mid-1758 Prussia invaded Moravia, besieging Olmütz in late May. The city was well defended, and by late June the Prussians' supplies were exhausted. Austrians intercepted and destroyed a major Prussian supply convoy on 30 June in the Battle of Domstadtl, and the invaders abandoned the siege, retreating into Upper Silesia. Russian forces advanced through East Prussia to threaten Brandenburg, fighting the Prussians to a costly draw on 25 August at the Battle of Zorndorf. An Austrian army advancing into Saxony made little progress, despite winning a substantial victory at the Battle of Hochkirch on 14 October.

In 1759 a united Austrian and Russian advance into eastern Brandenburg culminated in a major Prussian defeat at the Battle of Kunersdorf on 12 August, but the victorious allies did not pursue the defeated Prussians or occupy the Prussian capital at Berlin. After Kunersdorf Frederick had briefly believed the war totally lost, but the coalition's internal conflicts and hesitant leadership gave Prussia a second chance, an event that Frederick later termed the "Miracle of the House of Brandenburg". The succeeding months saw the Austrians retake Dresden and most of Saxony, with intermittent skirmishing in Saxony continuing into the next year.

In 1760 the Austrians advanced into Lower Silesia, where the Prussian and Austrian armies manoeuvred against each other for some time before engaging in the Battle of Liegnitz on 15 August; the battle ended in a solid Prussian victory, disrupting the Austrians' advance and restoring Prussian control of Lower Silesia. In late 1760 the Russians and Austrians briefly occupied Berlin, and on 3 November the main Prussian and Austrian armies fought the Battle of Torgau, a narrow Prussian victory that proved costly for both sides. The year 1761 saw little activity by the exhausted Prussian and Austrian forces, but Russian forces made advances in Pomerania and eastern Brandenburg that threatened a decisive end to the war the following year.

In January 1762, Austria was suddenly abandoned by its Russian ally upon the death of Empress Elizabeth. She was succeeded by the ardently pro-Prussian Peter III of Russia, who immediately recalled his armies from Berlin and Pomerania and made peace with Prussia by the Treaty of Saint Petersburg on 5 May. Peter was overthrown and assassinated within months, but by then the war had again shifted in Prussia's favour, and Russia did not resume hostilities. Both sides were nearing exhaustion, and peace talks to end the wider Seven Years' War began in late 1762. In the end, negotiators agreed again on a return to the status quo ante bellum, confirming Prussia's control of Silesia in the Treaty of Hubertusburg in February 1763. Prussia also committed to support the election of Maria Theresa's son, Archduke Joseph, as Holy Roman Emperor.

== Outcomes ==
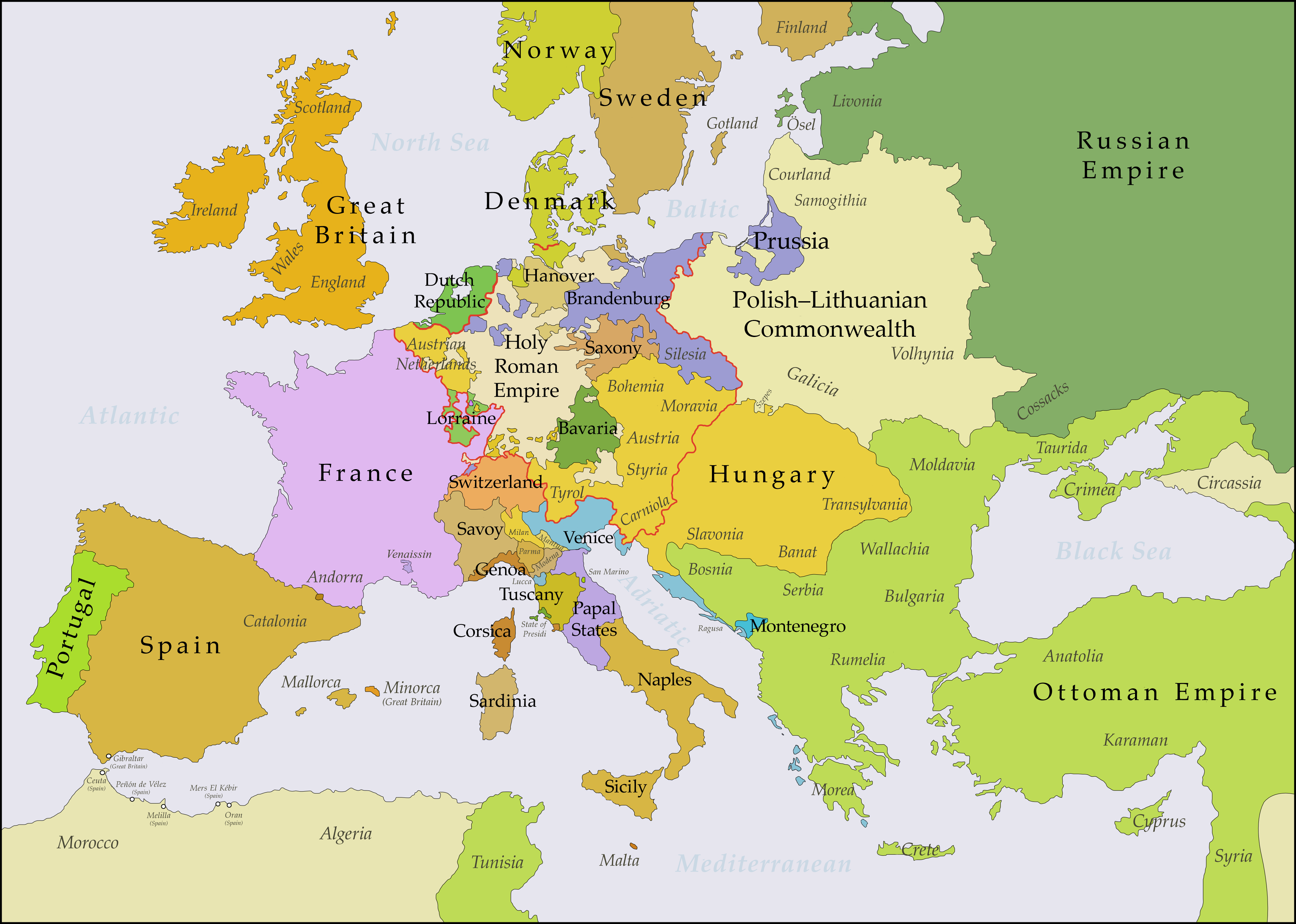
Europe in 1763 after the Third Silesian War, with Silesia under Prussian control

The Silesian Wars ended in Prussian victory over Austria, a view universal among contemporaries and broadly supported by historiography since. Prussia seized and defended a long-held Habsburg territory, and the status quo ante outcomes of the second and third wars confirmed this basic fact. These conflicts provoked a broad realignment in the European diplomatic system of the time, establishing an Austria–Prussia rivalry that would define German politics for a century until after the Austro-Prussian War of 1866.

=== Prussia ===
Prussia's unexpected victory over the Habsburg monarchy set it apart from German rivals such as Bavaria and Saxony, marking Prussia's rise to the status of a European great power, as well as the leading power of Protestant Germany. The kingdom had gained some 35,000 square kilometres (14,000 mi^{2}) of new territory and around a million new subjects in Glatz and Silesia, a populous and densely industrialised region that would contribute substantial manpower and taxes to the Prussian state. Geostrategically, Silesia also gave Prussia a threatening position with respect to Saxony and Austria and a strong defence against encirclement by Poland. Frederick's personal reputation was enormously enhanced by his successes in the wars, winning him the epithet "Frederick the Great". His debts to fortune (Russia's about-face after Elizabeth's death) and to British financial support were soon forgotten, while the memories of his energetic leadership and tactical genius were strenuously promoted. His small kingdom had defeated the Habsburg monarchy and defended its prize against Austria, Britain, Saxony, Russia, Sweden, and France, an accomplishment that appeared miraculous to contemporary observers.

Though sometimes depicted as a key moment in Prussia's rise to greatness, the wars nonetheless left the kingdom's economy and population devastated, and much of the remainder of Frederick's reign was spent repairing the damage. To mitigate population losses, the King continued his father's policy of encouraging Protestant refugees from Catholic realms to resettle in Prussia. The repeated currency devaluations imposed to finance the conflicts led to rapid inflation and great economic disruption in Prussia (and in occupied Saxony). After the wars the state began using its network of military grain depots and the excise on grain to stabilise food prices and alleviate grain shortages. Prussia also established a rudimentary social welfare system for impoverished and disabled veterans of the Silesian Wars.

Prussia's armed forces experienced heavy casualties in the wars, and the officer corps was severely depleted. After the peace of Hubertusburg the state had neither the money nor the manpower to rebuild the army to what it had been at Frederick's accession. In the succeeding War of the Bavarian Succession (1778–1779) the Prussians fought poorly, despite again being personally led by Frederick, and the Prussian army did not fare well against revolutionary France in 1792–1795. In 1806 the Prussians were shattered by Napoleon's Grande Armée at the Battle of Jena; only after a series of reforms motivated by the disasters of 1806–1807 did Prussian military power again begin to grow.

=== Austria ===
The defeats of the Silesian Wars cost the Habsburg monarchy its wealthiest province, and capitulating to a lesser German prince significantly dented the House of Habsburg's prestige. Prussia's confirmation as a first-rate power and the enhanced prestige of its king and army were long-term threats to Austria's hegemony in Germany. Still, by winning Prussia's support for the Imperial elections of her husband and son, Maria Theresa ensured the continuation of her family's titular pre-eminence in the Holy Roman Empire, though this was far less than she had hoped for. Defeat in the first two Silesian Wars at the hands of an enemy so apparently inferior created a strong impetus for change within the Habsburg monarchy, resulting in the first wave of Theresian reforms: a broad restructuring of the Habsburg administration and military, and a total realignment of Habsburg foreign policy through the "Diplomatic Revolution".

After the renewed disappointment of the Third Silesian War, a second wave of Theresian reforms ensued. In 1761 the Habsburg monarchy implemented newly centralised administrative and policymaking bodies to streamline what had often been a chaotic executive process. The 1760s and 1770s saw vigorous efforts to improve tax collection, particularly in the Duchy of Milan and the Austrian Netherlands, which led to significant increases in state revenues. In 1766 the crown promulgated its first common code of laws, the Codex Theresianus, in an effort to unify the realm's legal systems. Aiming to increase the peasantry's ability to contribute to the state's tax base, Maria Theresa issued a series of Robot Patents between 1771 and 1778 restricting forced peasant labour in her German and Bohemian lands, and her son would carry the process further with his Serfdom Patent. The state also implemented compulsory primary education and established a system of secular public schools. Beginning with these steps, wide-ranging efforts to modernise the Habsburg monarchy over the next half century grew out of Austria's defeats, culminating in the Josephinism of the 1780s.

== See also ==
- Wars and battles involving Prussia
- Imperial Army of the Holy Roman Emperor
- Prussian Army

== Sources ==
- Anderson, Matthew Smith (1995). The War of the Austrian Succession: 1740–1748. New York: Longman. ISBN 978-0-582-05950-4.
- Asprey, Robert B. (1986). Frederick the Great: The Magnificent Enigma. New York: Ticknor and Fields. ISBN 978-0-89919-352-6.
- Black, Jeremy (1990). "Essay and Reflection: On the 'Old System' and the 'Diplomatic Revolution' of the Eighteenth Century". International History Review. 12 (2): 301–323. doi:10.1080/07075332.1990.9640547.
- Black, Jeremy (1994). European Warfare, 1660–1815. London: UCL Press. ISBN 978-1-85728-172-9.
- Black, Jeremy (2002). European International Relations 1648–1815. London: Palgrave Macmillan. pp. 102–103. ISBN 978-0-333-96450-7.
- Browning, Reed (April 2005). "New Views on the Silesian Wars". Journal of Military History. 69 (2): 521–534. doi:10.1353/jmh.2005.0077. S2CID 159463824.
- Carlyle, Thomas (1858). Book III – The Hohenzollerns in Brandenburg – 1412–1718. History of Friedrich II of Prussia, Called Frederick the Great. Vol. I. London: Chapman & Hall. OCLC 1045538020.
- Carlyle, Thomas (1862a). Book XIII – First Silesian War, Leaving the General European One Ablaze All Round, Gets Ended – May 1741 – July 1742. History of Friedrich II of Prussia, Called Frederick the Great. Vol. III. London: Chapman & Hall. OCLC 1045538020.
- Carlyle, Thomas (1862b). Book XIV – The Surrounding European War Does Not End – August 1742 – July 1744. History of Friedrich II of Prussia, Called Frederick the Great. Vol. III. London: Chapman & Hall. OCLC 1045538020.
- Carlyle, Thomas (1864a). Book XV – Second Silesian War, Important Episode in the General European One – 15th August 1744 – 25th December 1745. History of Friedrich II of Prussia, Called Frederick the Great. Vol. IV. London: Chapman & Hall. OCLC 1045538020.
- Carlyle, Thomas (1864b). Book XVI – The Ten Years of Peace – 1746–1756. History of Friedrich II of Prussia, Called Frederick the Great. Vol. IV. London: Chapman & Hall. OCLC 1045538020.
- Carlyle, Thomas (1865a). Book XIX – Friedrich Like to Be Overwhelmed in the Seven Years' War – 1759–1760. History of Friedrich II of Prussia, Called Frederick the Great. Vol. V. London: Chapman & Hall. OCLC 1045538020.
- Carlyle, Thomas (1865b). Book XX – Friedrich Is Not to Be Overwhelmed: the Seven Years' War Gradually Ends – 25th April 1760 – 15th February 1763. History of Friedrich II of Prussia, Called Frederick the Great. Vol. VI. London: Chapman & Hall. OCLC 1045538020.
- Clark, Christopher (2006). Iron Kingdom: The Rise and Downfall of Prussia, 1600–1947. Cambridge, Massachusetts: Belknap Press. ISBN 978-0-674-02385-7.
- Clifford, John Herbert (1914). The Standard History of the World, by Great Historians. Vol. 5. New York: University Society. OCLC 867881191.
- Creveld, Martin van (1977). Supplying War: Logistics from Wallenstein to Patton. Cambridge: Cambridge University Press. ISBN 978-0-521-21730-9.
- Duffy, Christopher (1974). The Army of Frederick the Great. New York: Hippocrene Books. ISBN 978-0-88254-277-5.
- Fraser, David (2000). Frederick the Great: King of Prussia. London: Allen Lane. ISBN 978-0-7139-9377-6.
- Hirsch, Theodor (1881). "Johann Georg, Markgraf von Brandenburg". In von Liliencron, Rochus (ed.). Allgemeine Deutsche Biographie. Allgemeine Deutsche Biographie (in German). Vol. XIV. Leipzig: Duncker & Humblot. pp. 175–176. OCLC 309922855.
- Hochedlinger, Michael (2003). Austria's Wars of Emergence: War, State and Society in the Habsburg Monarchy, 1683–1797. London: Longman. ISBN 978-0-582-29084-6.
- Holborn, Hajo (1982). A History of Modern Germany: 1648–1840. Princeton, New Jersey: Princeton University Press. ISBN 978-0-691-00796-0.
- Horn, D. B. (1957). "The Diplomatic Revolution". In Lindsay, J. O. (ed.). The New Cambridge Modern History vol. 7, The Old Regime: 1713–63. Cambridge: Cambridge University Press. ISBN 978-0-521-04545-2.
- Ingrao, Charles W. (1994). The Habsburg Monarchy, 1618–1815. Cambridge: Cambridge University Press. ISBN 978-0-521-38009-6.
- Luvaas, Jay (2009). "Frederick and the Art of War". Frederick the Great on the Art of War. By Friedrich II, King of Prussia. Luvaas, Jay (ed.). New York: Da Capo Press. ISBN 978-0-7867-4977-5.
- Marston, Daniel (2001). The Seven Years' War. London: Osprey Publishing. ISBN 978-1-4728-9564-6.
- Redman, Herbert (2014). Frederick the Great and the Seven Years' War, 1756–1763. Jefferson, North Carolina: McFarland & Company. ISBN 978-0-7864-7669-5.
- Schweizer, Karl W. (1989). England, Prussia, and the Seven Years War: Studies in Alliance Policies and Diplomacy. Lewiston, New York: Edwin Mellen Press. ISBN 978-0-88946-465-0.
- Shennan, J. H. (2005). International Relations in Europe, 1689-1789. London: Taylor & Francis. ISBN 978-1-134-89996-8.
- Showalter, Dennis E. (2012). Frederick the Great: A Military History. Barnsley, England: Frontline Books. ISBN 978-1-78303-479-6.
- Stone, David (2006). A Military History of Russia: From Ivan the Terrible to the War in Chechnya. Westport, Connecticut: Praeger Publishing. ISBN 978-0-275-98502-8.
- Szabo, Franz A. J. (2008). The Seven Years' War in Europe 1756–1763. London: Longman. ISBN 978-0-582-29272-7.
- Vocelka, Karl (2000). Geschichte Österreichs: Kultur, Gesellschaft, Politik (in German). Graz: Styria Media Group. ISBN 978-3-222-12825-7.
- Wilson, Peter H. (2016). Heart of Europe: A History of the Holy Roman Empire. Cambridge, Massachusetts: Harvard University Press. ISBN 978-0-674-05809-5.
