= Hans Kudlich =

Austrian politician, writer, and physician (1823–1917)

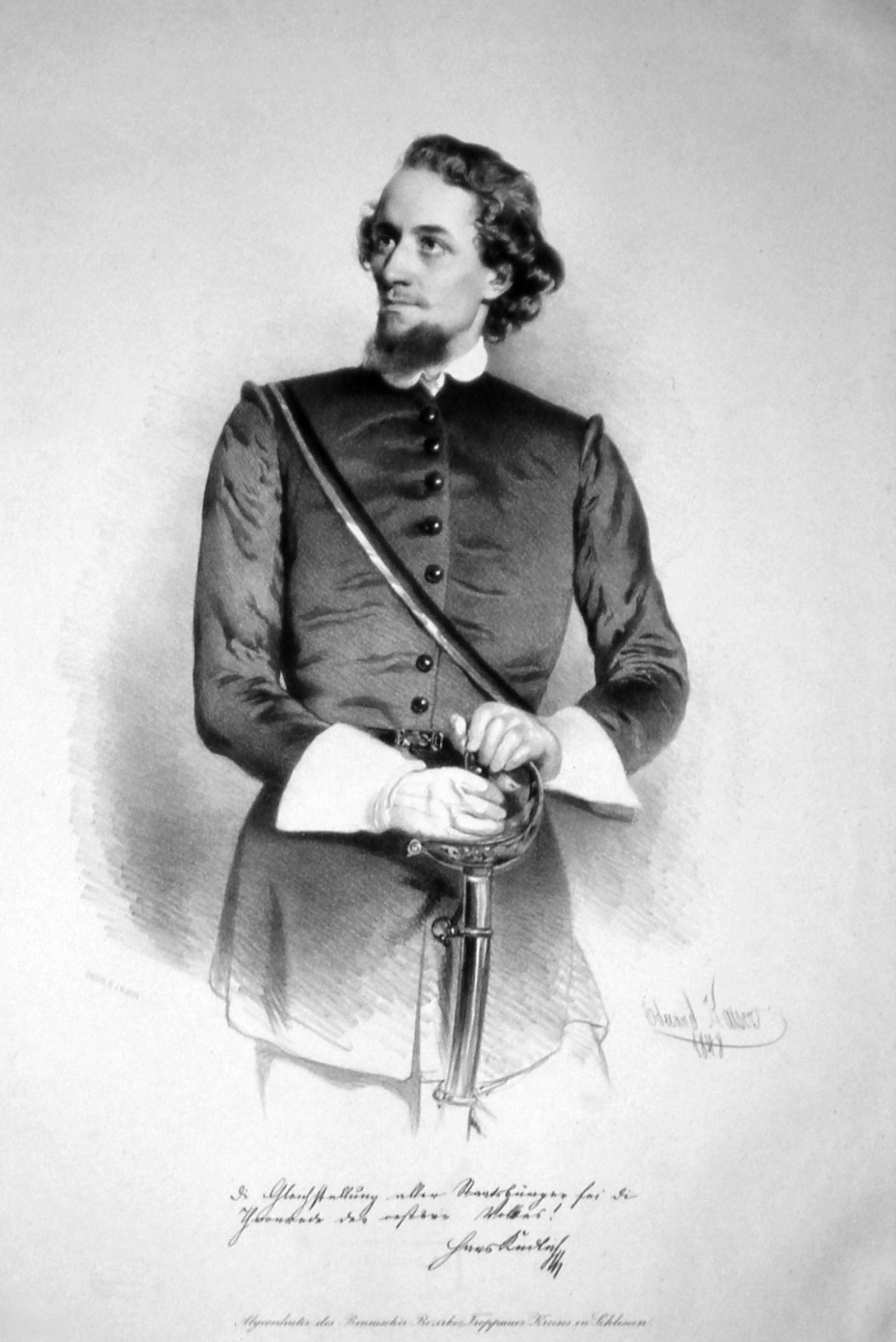
- Lithograph by Eduard Kaiser, 1848

Personal details
- Born: Johann Kudlich; October 23, 1823 Lobenstein, Austrian Silesia, Austrian Empire
- Died: November 10, 1917 (aged 94) Hoboken, New Jersey, U.S.
- Spouse: Louise Vogt
- Occupation: Political activist, member of the Austrian Parliament, writer, physician
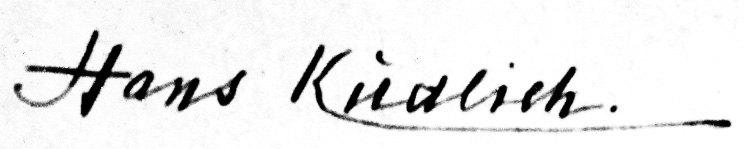
- Signature

Johann "Hans" Kudlich (Americanized as John; October 23, 1823 – November 10, 1917) was an Austrian political activist, Austrian legislator, American immigrant, writer, and physician.

== Early life ==
Kudlich was born in Úvalno (that time called Lobenstein) near Opava in Upper Silesia, Austrian Empire (today the Czech Republic) on October 23, 1823, in to a peasant family.

== Political life ==
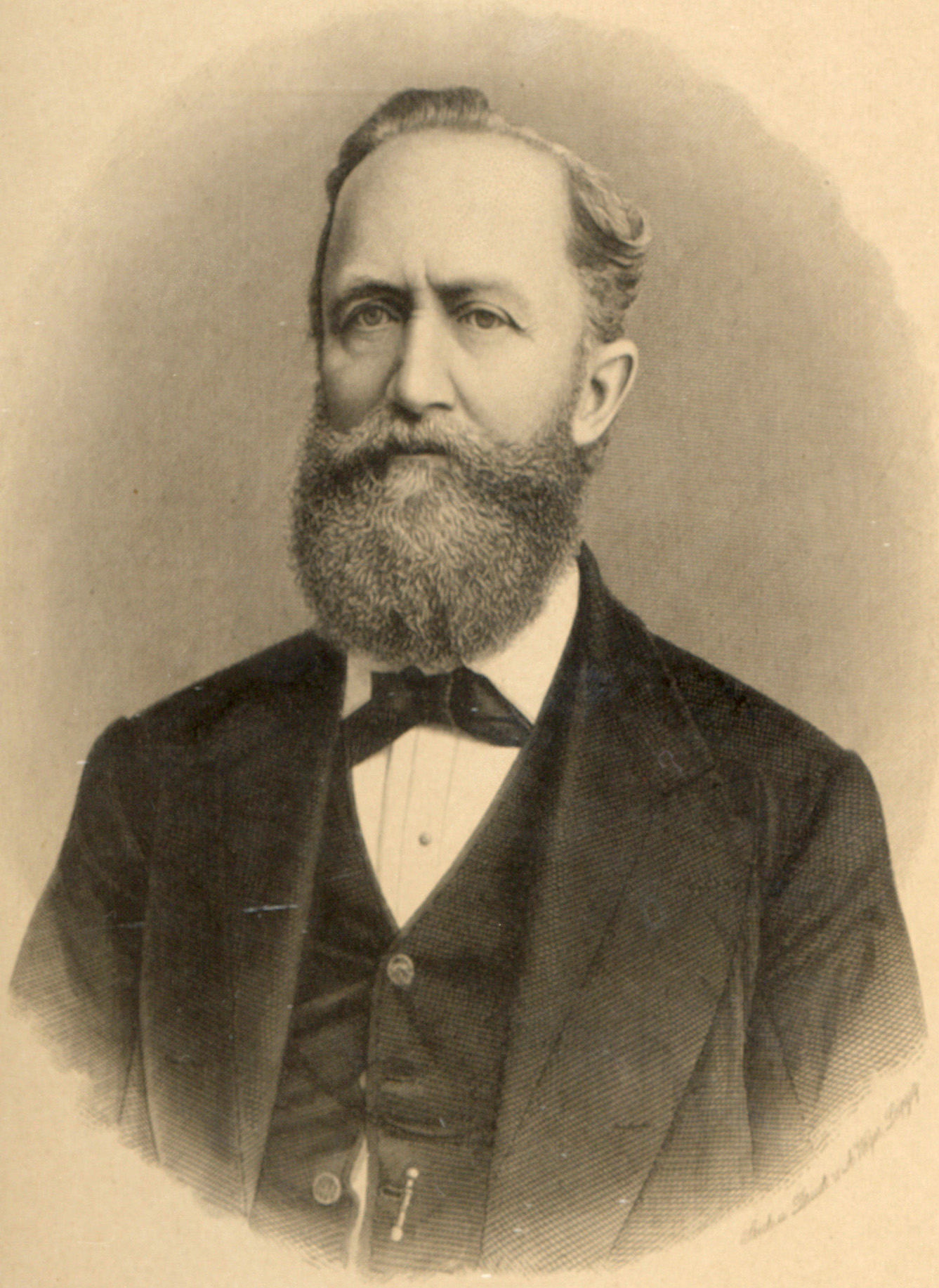
Hans Kudlich, c. 1880

He is noted for being a leader of the revolutionary movement to end the feudal policies of the Austrian Empire under Ferdinand I of Austria. From the 1700s, the empire had enforced a decree known as the Robot Patent which required farmers to serve an annual quota of labor without compensation to the noble landowners. Kudlich was elected to the Austrian Reichstag (parliament) in early 1848 at the age of 25. He introduced a bill to abolish forced servitude and the bill was approved by the legislature. He was popularly titled as the Bauernbefreier, meaning the liberator of peasant farmers from the involuntary servitude of serfdom.

The parliament was dissolved by force on March 7, 1849, when the rebellion that had briefly taken control of Vienna was crushed. Kudlich up to the time of the dissolution of the parliament had worked to rally support for the revolution. After the dissolution of the parliament he fled first to Germany and then to Switzerland.

After his political career, Kudlich obtained a medical degree in Bern and Zurich. He left Switzerland in 1853, emigrated to the United States, and settled in Hoboken, New Jersey. He worked as a medical doctor, and co-founded the Hoboken Academy in 1861, a German-American school (later merged with the Stevens Preparatory School, later Stevens Academy, which ceased in 1974).

== Death ==
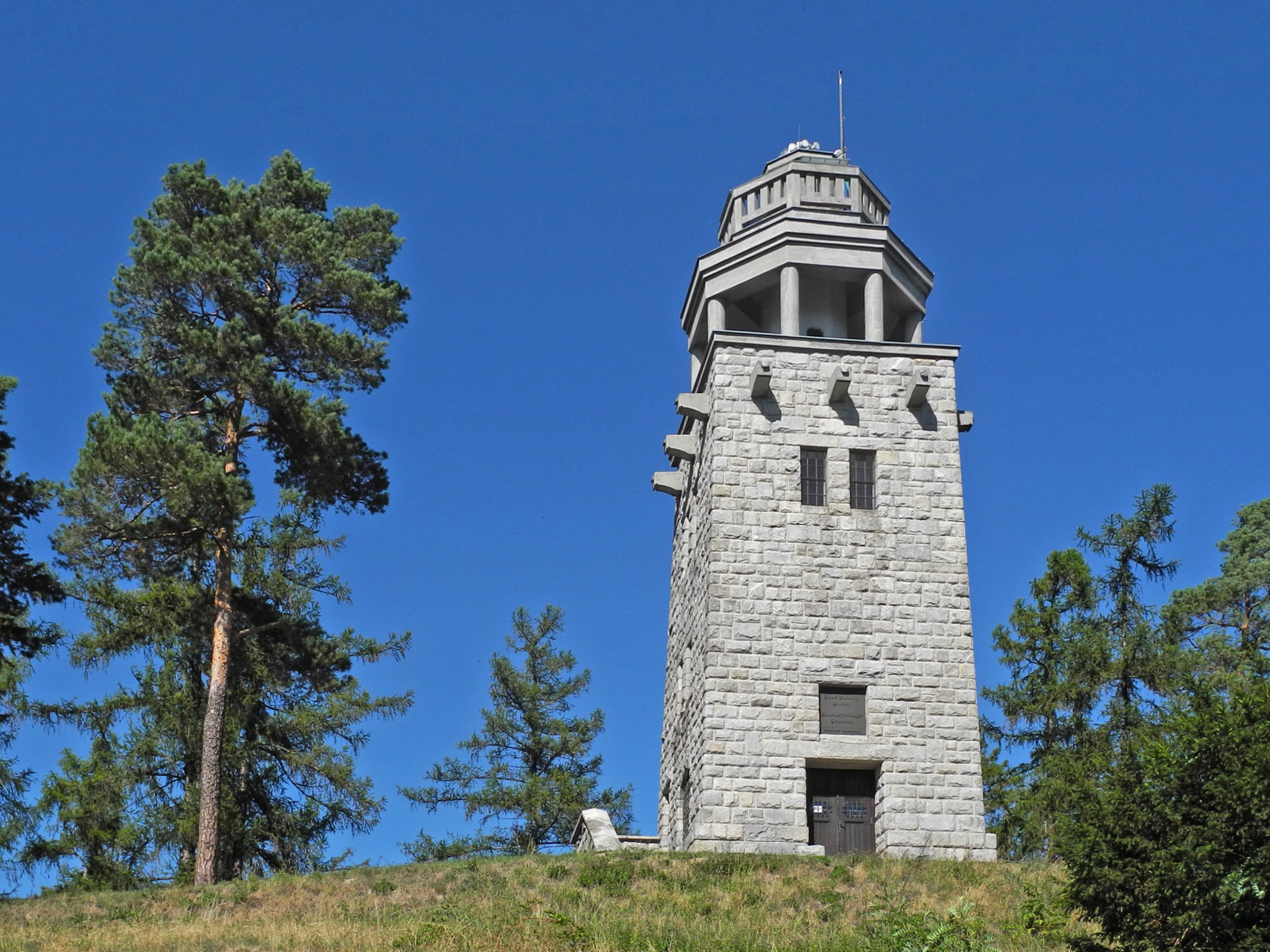
Hans Kudlich Observation Tower in Úvalno

Kudlich died November 11, 1917, in Hoboken, New Jersey, US. In 1925 his ashes and those of his wife, Louisa Kudlich (née Vogt), were interred in the mausoleum at the base of the Hans Kudlich Observation Tower. The tower is located in Úvalno (Kudlich's birthplace) in what is now the Czech Republic.

== Books by Hans Kudlich ==
- Rückblicke und Erinnerungen von Hans Kudlich, Mit dem Porträt des Verfassers (Retrospectives and Memories of Hans Kudlich, With the Author's Portrayals). 3 vols, Vienna-Leipzig-Budapest, 1873.
- Die Revolution des Jahres 1848 (The Revolution of 1848). Litoměřice, 1913.

== See also ==
- Revolutions of 1848
