= Ignaz Feigerle =

- Bishop of Sankt Pölten
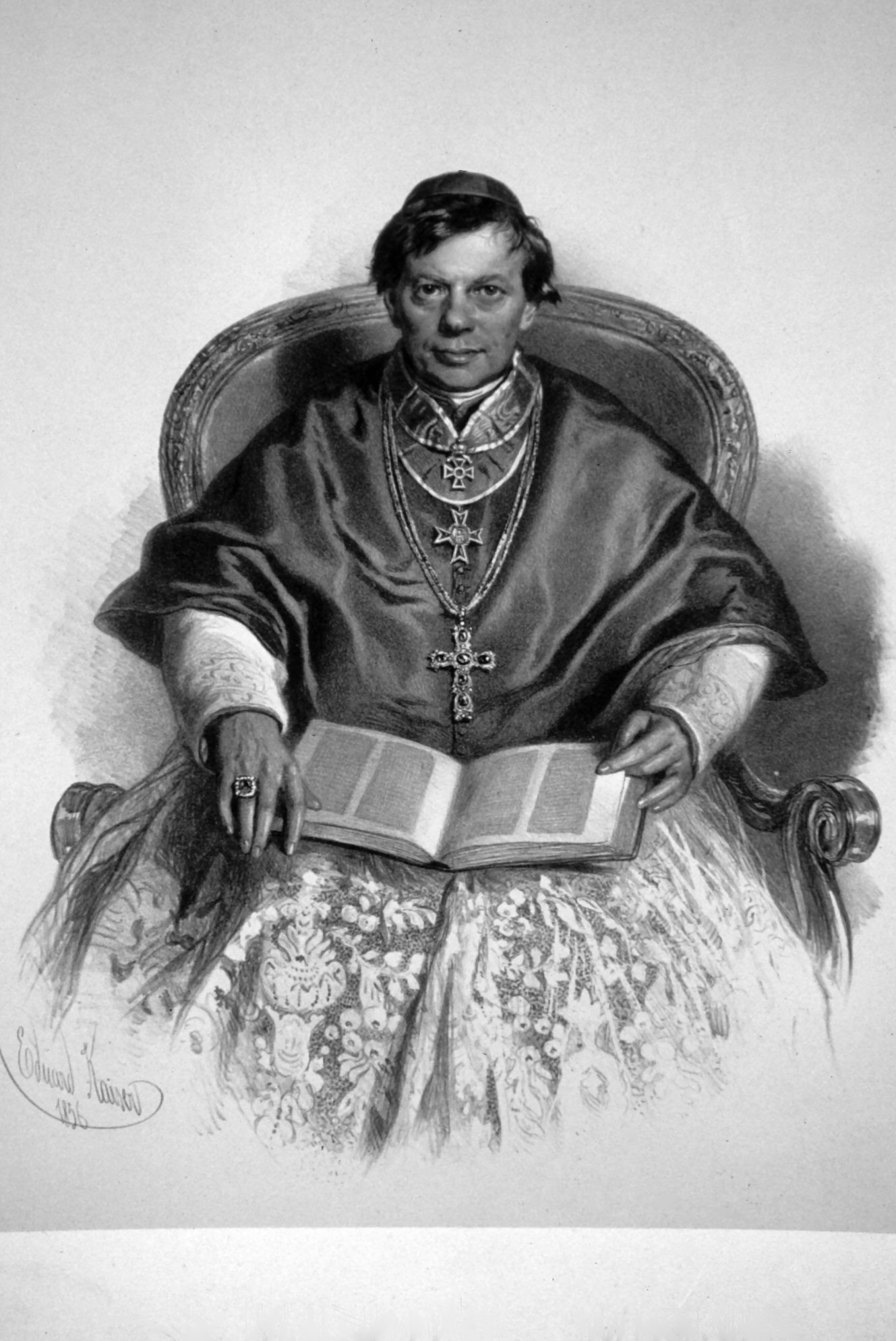
- Ignaz Feigerle. Lithograph by Eduard Kaiser
- Church: Catholic Church
- Diocese: Diocese of Sankt Pölten
- In office: 15 March 1852 – 27 September 1863
- Predecessor: Anton Aloys Buchmayer
- Successor: Josef Fessler

Orders
- Ordination: 21 March 1818
- Consecration: 25 April 1852 by Vinzenz Eduard Milde

Personal details
- Born: 7 April 1795 Biskupstwo (in present-day Náměšť na Hané), Kingdom of Bohemia, Holy Roman Empire
- Died: 27 September 1863 (aged 68) Ochsenburg (in present-day St. Pölten), Lower Austria, Austrian Empire

Ignaz Feigerle (7 April 1795 in Biskupstwo, Mähren – 27 September 1863 in Ochsenburg) was a Catholic theologian and bishop of the Diocese of Sankt Pōlten.

== Life ==
Feigerle studied at Frintaneum in Vienna. In 1825 he became Professor for Pastoral theology at the Palacký University of Olomouc. In 1829 he moved to the University of Vienna, where he became Rector in 1846. In 1851 he became Bishop of St. Pölten. In 1858 he founded Hippolytus, a scholarly journal, which was edited by Matthäus Binder and Anton Kerschbaumer.

== Bibliography ==
- Ekkart Sauser (2002). "Ignaz Feigerle". In Bautz, Traugott (ed.). Biographisch-Bibliographisches Kirchenlexikon (BBKL) (in German). Vol. 20. Nordhausen: Bautz. cols. 480–481. ISBN 3-88309-091-3.
- "Feigerle Ignaz". In: Österreichisches Biographisches Lexikon 1815–1950 (ÖBL). Vol. 1, Austrian Academy of Sciences, Vienna 1957, p. 291.
- Anton Kerschbaumer: Bischof Feigerle, nach dem Leben geschildert, Wien, 1864; Komplettscan des Buches
