= Josef Fessler =

Austrian Roman Catholic bishop (1813–1872)

The Most Reverend Josef Fessler
- Bishop of Sankt Pölten
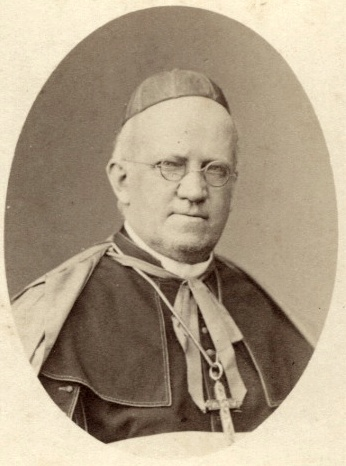
- Church: Catholic Church
- Diocese: Sankt Pölten
- Appointed: 27 March 1865
- Term ended: 25 April 1872
- Predecessor: Ignaz Feigerle
- Successor: Matthäus Joseph Binder
- Other posts: Auxiliary Bishop of Brixen (1862–65); Titular Bishop of Nyssa (1862–65)

Orders
- Ordination: 30 July 1837
- Consecration: 31 March 1862 by Vinzenz Gasser

Personal details
- Born: 2 December 1813 Lochau, Further Austria, Austria
- Died: 25 April 1872 (aged 58) Sankt Pölten, Austria

Josef Fessler (1813-1872) was Roman Catholic Bishop of Sankt Pölten in Austria, a secretary of the First Vatican Council and an authority on patristics.

== Biography and works ==
Josef Fessler was born to a peasant family on 2 December 1813, at Lochau near Bregenz in the Vorarlberg. His classical studies were done at Feldkirch, his philosophy at Innsbruck including a year of legal studies, and his theology at Brixen. He was ordained priest in 1837. After a year as master in a school at Innsbruck, he studied for two more years in Vienna life, then became professor of ecclesiastical history and canon law in the theological school at Brixen, 1841-52.

From 1856 to 1861, Fessler was professor of canon law in the University of Vienna, after making special studies for six months at Rome. He was consecrated as assistant bishop to the bishop of Brixen, Vinzenz Gasser, on 31 March 1862, and became his vicar-general for the Vorarlberg. On 23 September 1864, he was named by the emperor Bishop of St. Polten, not far from Vienna. When at Rome in 1867, he was named assistant at the papal throne.

In 1869, Pope Pius IX proposed Fessler to the Congregation for the direction of the coming Vatican Council as secretary to the council. The appointment was well received, the only objection being from Prospero Caterini, who thought the choice of an Austrian might make the other nations jealous. Fessler was informed of his appointment on 27 March, and as the pope wished him to come with all speed to Rome, he arrived there on 8 July, after hastily dispatching the business of his diocese.

The Catholic Encyclopedia describes Fessler's work as secretary as giving "universal satisfaction", praising his "vast and intimate acquaintance with the Church Fathers and with ecclesiastical history" and his "thorough knowledge of canon law." The encyclopedia also speculates that the burden of the work may have contributed to his early death on 25 April 1872.

== Works ==
Fessler's works include:

- Über die Provincial-Concilien und Diöcesan-Synoden (Innsbruck, 1849), published at the request of the Episcopal Conference of Wurzburg
- Institutiones Patrologiae quas ad frequentiorem utiliorem et faciliorem SS. Patrum lectionem promovendam concinnavit J. Fessler (Innsbruck, 2 Volumes in octavo, 1850–1); reprinted (Innsbruck, 1890-6) by Bernard Jungmann
- Das letzte und das nächste allgemeine Konsil (Freiburg, 1869), published in advance of the First Vatican Council

After the First Vatican Council, Johann Friedrich von Schulte published a pamphlet opposing papal infallibility as defined at the council. Fessler responded with Die wahre und die falsche Unfehlbarkeit der Päpste (Vienna, 1871), which was translated into French by Emmanuel Cosquin and into English by Ambrose St. John (The True and False Infallibility of the Popes, London, 1875). In this brochure, Fessler argued for a definition of infallibility based on the writings of Italian Ultramontane theologians including Robert Bellarmine, Pietro Ballerini, and Giovanni Perrone. Karl Josef von Hefele, the Bishop of Rottenburg, who had previously opposed the doctrine of infaillibility, wrote in support of Fessler's position, and Pius IX published a Brief approving it.

== Sources and references ==
- Anton Erdinger, Dr. Joseph Fessler, Bischof v. St. Polten, ein Lebensbild (Brixen, 1874)
- Mitterrutzner in Kirchenlexikon
- Theodor Granderath and Konrad Kirch, Geschichte des Vatiannischen Konzils (Freiburg im Breisgau, 2 volumes, 1903).
