= Eduard Kaiser =

Austrian painter and lithographer (1820–1895)

- Born: 22 February 1820; Graz, Austrian Empire
- Died: 30 August 1895 (aged 75); Vienna, Austro-Hungarian Empire
- Occupations: Painter; lithographer

Eduard Kaiser (22 February 1820 in Graz – 30 August 1895 in Vienna) was an Austrian painter and lithographer, as was his brother Alexander Kaiser (1819–1872). He was a celebrated portrait artist who drew the attention of Elisabeth, Empress of Austria.

== Life ==
Eduard Kaiser was the son of Joseph Franz Kaiser, the owner of a lithographic business in Graz. He studied at the Wiener Akademie beside Josef Danhauser and soon became a serious competitor for the top Vienna portrait-lithographer Josef Kriehuber. Enthused by the ideas of the revolution, in 1848 Kaiser joined the Academic Legion - during this time he made portraits of almost all the main figures of the March Revolution (Josef Radetzky, Franz Schuselka, Hans Kudlich Adolf Fischhof, Carl Giskra). In 1852/53 he lived in Rome. After returning to Austria he developed a very profitable portrait-lithography business, with clients including Franz Joseph I of Austro-Hungary, his empress Elisabeth of Austro-Hungary, Friedrich Hebbel, Robert Schumann and Clara Schumann.

In 1867–1886 he lived in Rome again, where he devoted himself very successfully to watercolour reproductions of classical masterpieces - these reproductions were then sold in Great Britain as colour lithographs. He then returned to Vienna and to portrait painting in oils and watercolour.

== Selected lithographs ==
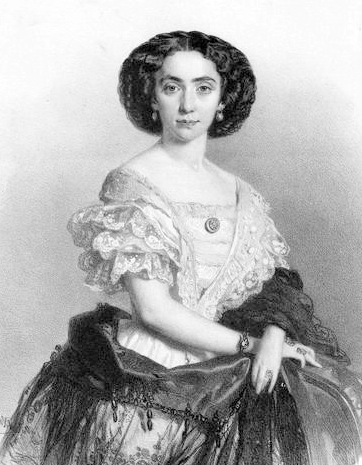
Rosa Csillag

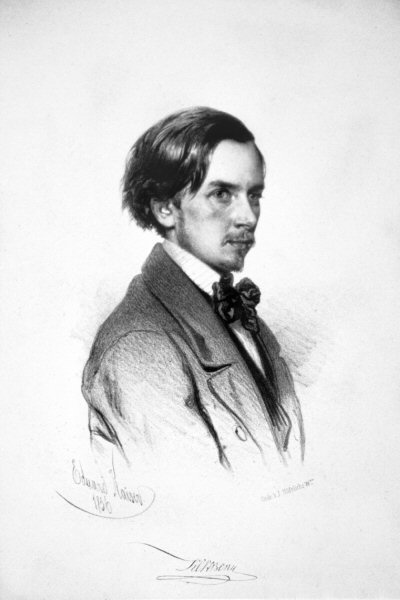
Karl-Maria Kertbeny

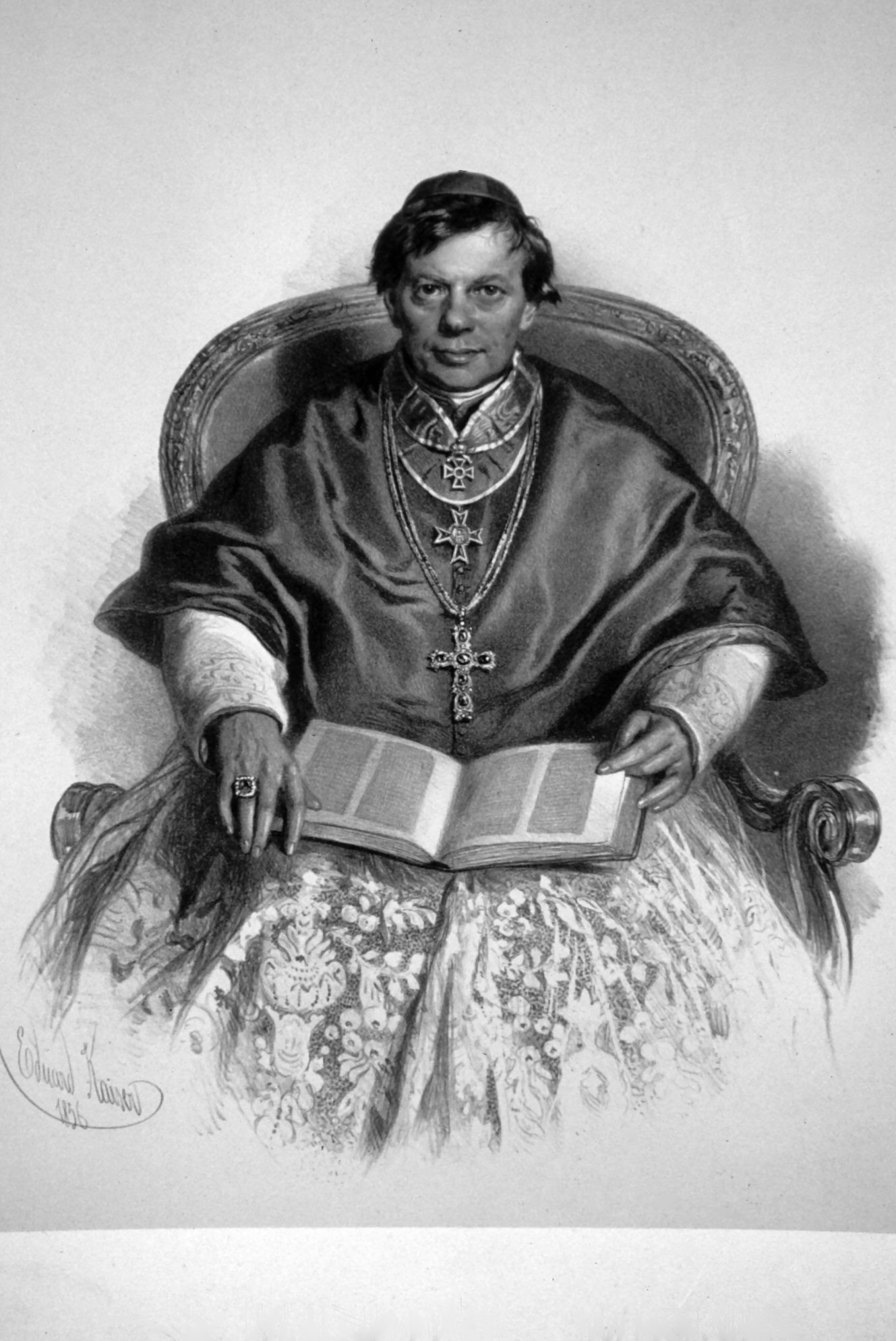
Ignaz Feigerle

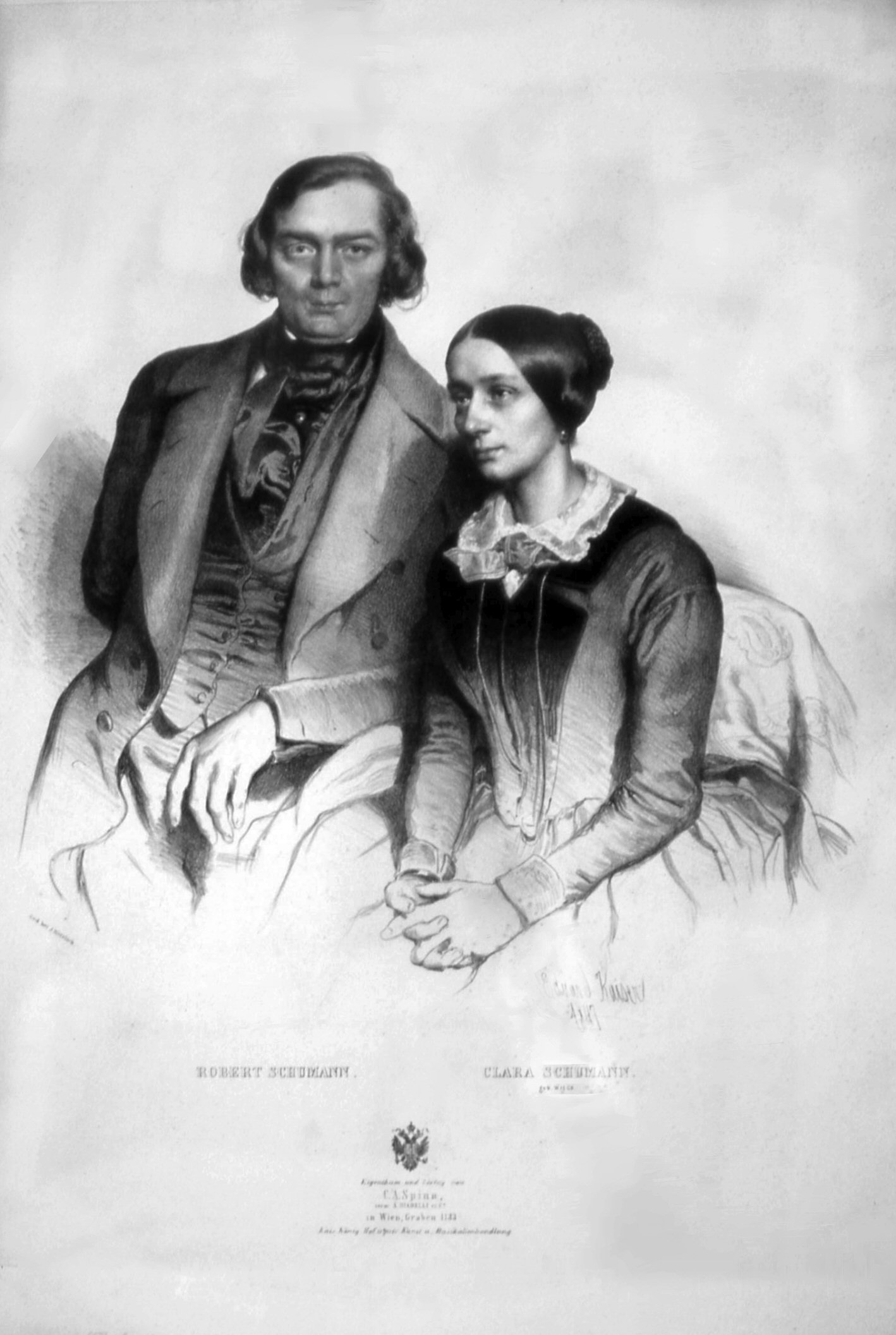
Robert and Clara Schumann

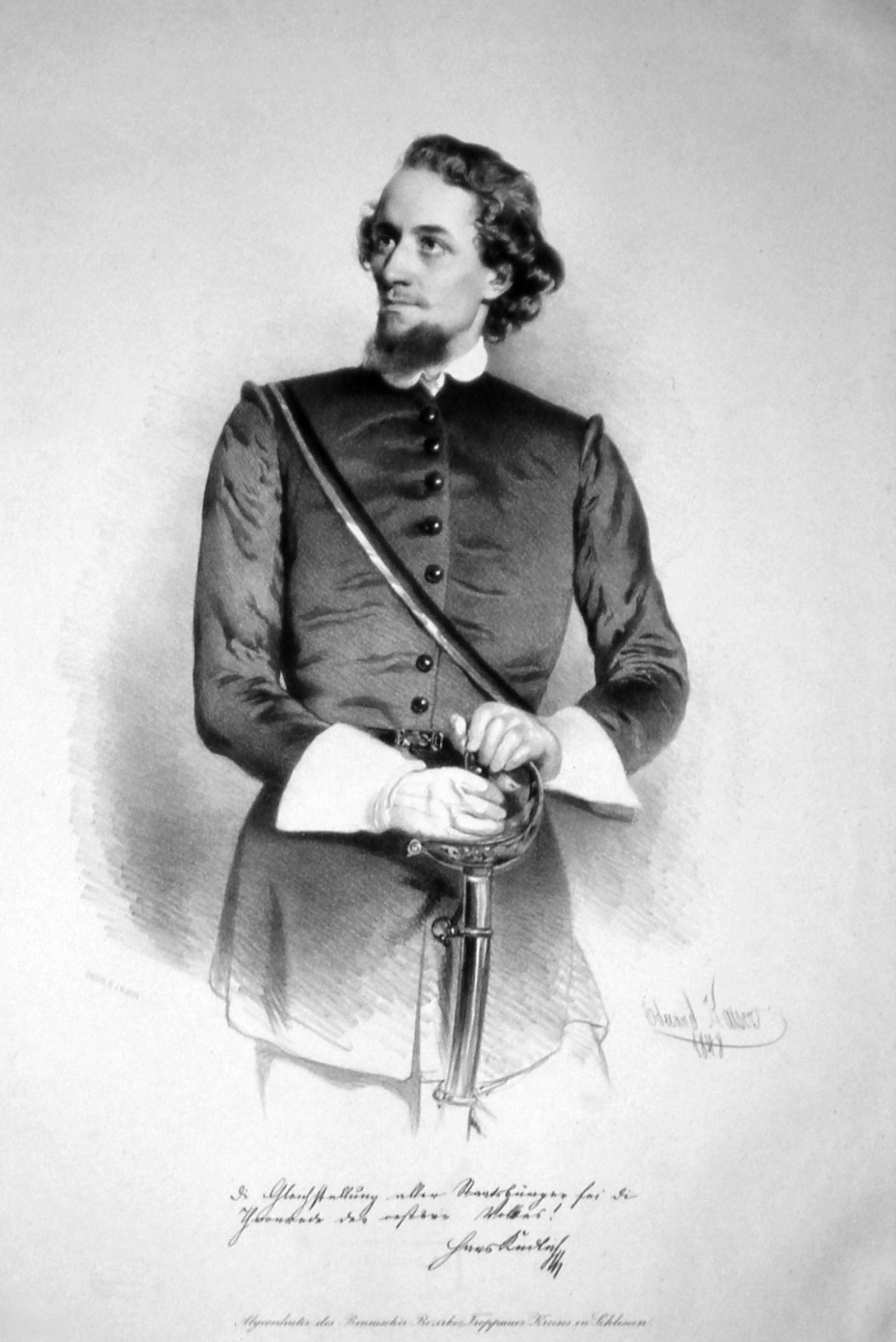
Hans Kudlich

== Bibliography ==
- (in German) Kaiser, Eduard. In Constantin von Wurzbach: Biographisches Lexikon des Kaiserthums Oesterreich. 10. Band. Wien 1863. Online-Version:
- (in German) Eduard Kaiser. In: Ulrich Thieme, Felix Becker etc.: Allgemeines Lexikon der Bildenden Künstler von der Antike bis zur Gegenwart. Volume 19, E. A. Seemann, Leipzig 1926, S. 443f
