= Joseph Franz Kaiser =

Austrian lithographer (1786–1859)

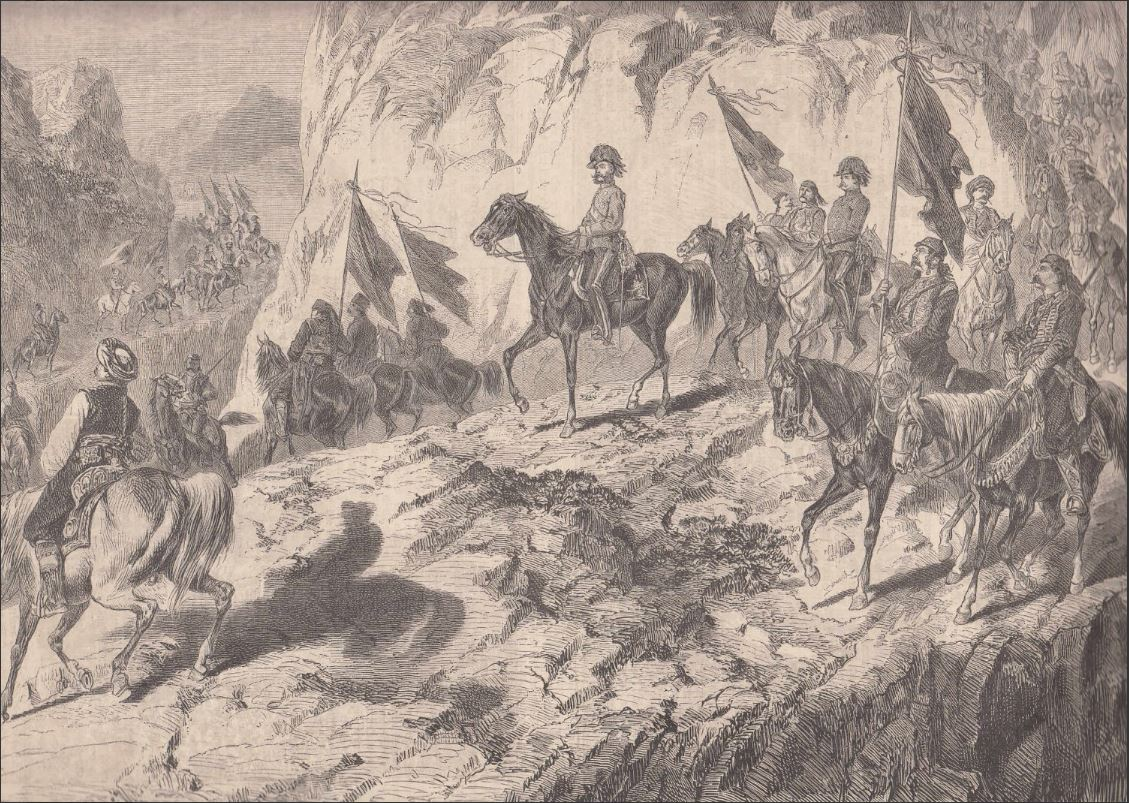
Joseph Franz Kaiser, 1875

Joseph Franz Kaiser (11 March 1786 in Graz – 19 September 1859 in Graz) was an army officer, bookbinder, lithographer and publisher from the Styrian region of Austria. His sons Eduard and Alexander were also lithographers.

== Life ==
In 1806 he is recorded as a member of Graz's militia cavalry and when the militia developed into the Landwehr in 1808 he rose to officer rank, becoming an ensign on 29 March 1809. As a member of the 2nd Graz Landwehr-Battalion and commander of its 6th Company, he fought at the battle of Raab under the command of Archduke John of Austria.
