= Alexander Kaiser =

Austrian artist (1819–1872)

Alexander Kaiser (26 February 1819, in Graz – 25 October 1872, in Graz) was an Austrian painter and lithographer. He was the son of the bookbinder and lithographer Joseph Franz Kaiser and brother to the lithographer and painter Eduard Kaiser.

== Sources ==
- Constantin von Wurzbach: Kaiser, A.. In: Biographisches Lexikon des Kaiserthums Oesterreich. 10. Theil. Kaiserlich-königliche Hof- und Staatsdruckerei, Wien 1863, p. 373
- Kaiser Alexander. In: Österreichisches Biographisches Lexikon 1815–1950 (ÖBL). Band 3, Verlag der Österreichischen Akademie der Wissenschaften, Wien 1965, p. 180.
