= Úvalno =

- Municipality
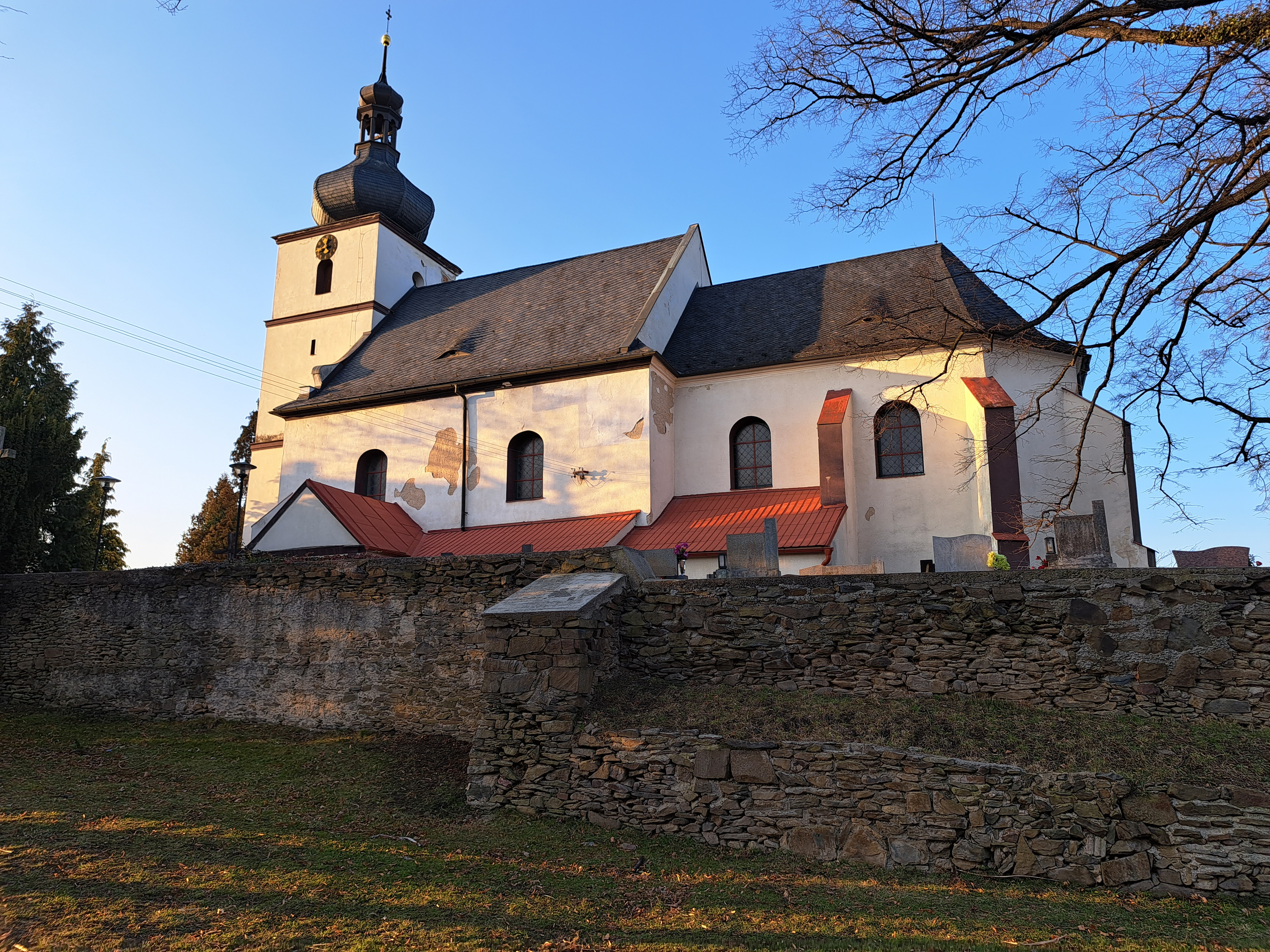
- Church of Saint Nicholas

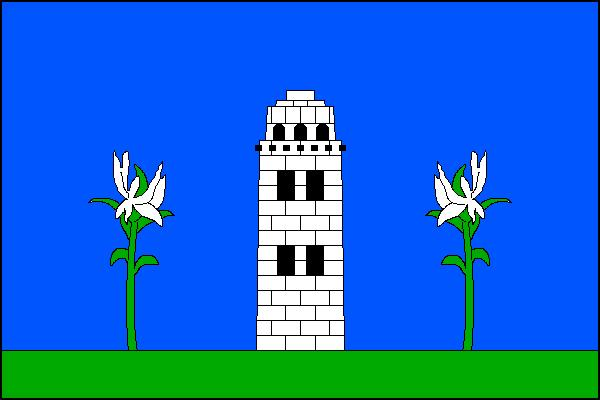
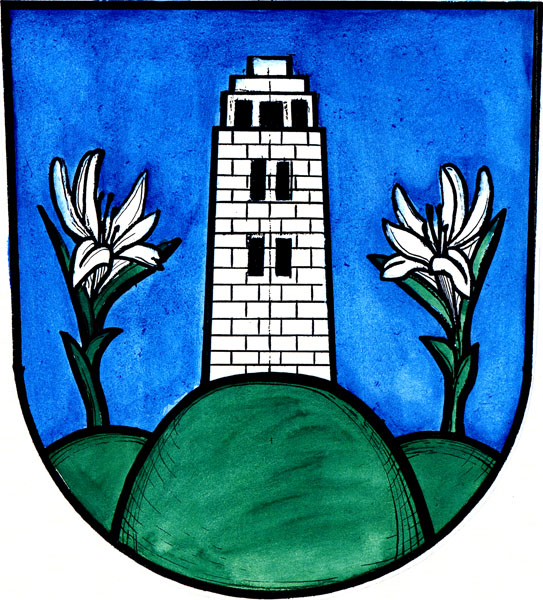
- Flag Coat of arms

- Location in the Czech Republic
- Coordinates: 50°2′50″N 17°44′41″E
- Country: Czech Republic
- Region: Moravian-Silesian
- District: Bruntál
- First mentioned: 1238

Area
  - Total: 14.77 km^{2} (5.70 sq mi)
- Elevation: 325 m (1,066 ft)

Population (2026-01-01)
  - Total: 975
  - Density: 66.0/km^{2} (171/sq mi)
- Time zone: UTC+1 (CET)
  - Summer (DST): UTC+2 (CEST)
- Postal code: 793 91
- Website: www.uvalno.cz

Úvalno (German: Lobenstein) is a municipality and village in Bruntál District in the Moravian-Silesian Region of the Czech Republic. It has about 1,000 inhabitants.

== Geography ==
Úvalno is located about 16 kilometres (10 mi) northwest from Opava and 42 km (26 mi) northwest from Ostrava, on the border with Poland. It lies mostly in the Nízký Jeseník range, only a small eastern part extends into the Opava Hilly Land. The highest point is at 435 m (1,427 ft) above sea level. The Czech–Polish border is formed here by the Opava River.

== History ==
The first written mention of Úvalno is from 1238.

Before World War II, the municipality had a German majority. After the war, the German-speaking inhabitants were expelled and Úvalno was repopulated by Czechs.

== Demographics ==
Historical population

Year	Pop.	±%
1869	1,013	—
1880	1,100	+8.6%
1890	1,232	+12.0%
1900	1,304	+5.8%
1910	1,386	+6.3%

Year	Pop.	±%
1921	1,461	+5.4%
1930	1,720	+17.7%
1950	1,050	−39.0%
1961	1,197	+14.0%
1970	914	−23.6%

Year	Pop.	±%
1980	966	+5.7%
1991	877	−9.2%
2001	954	+8.8%
2011	936	−1.9%
2021	928	−0.9%

Source: Censuses

== Transport ==
The I/57 road (the section from Opava to Krnov) runs through the municipality.

Úvalno is located on the Opava–Rýmařov railway line.

== Sights ==
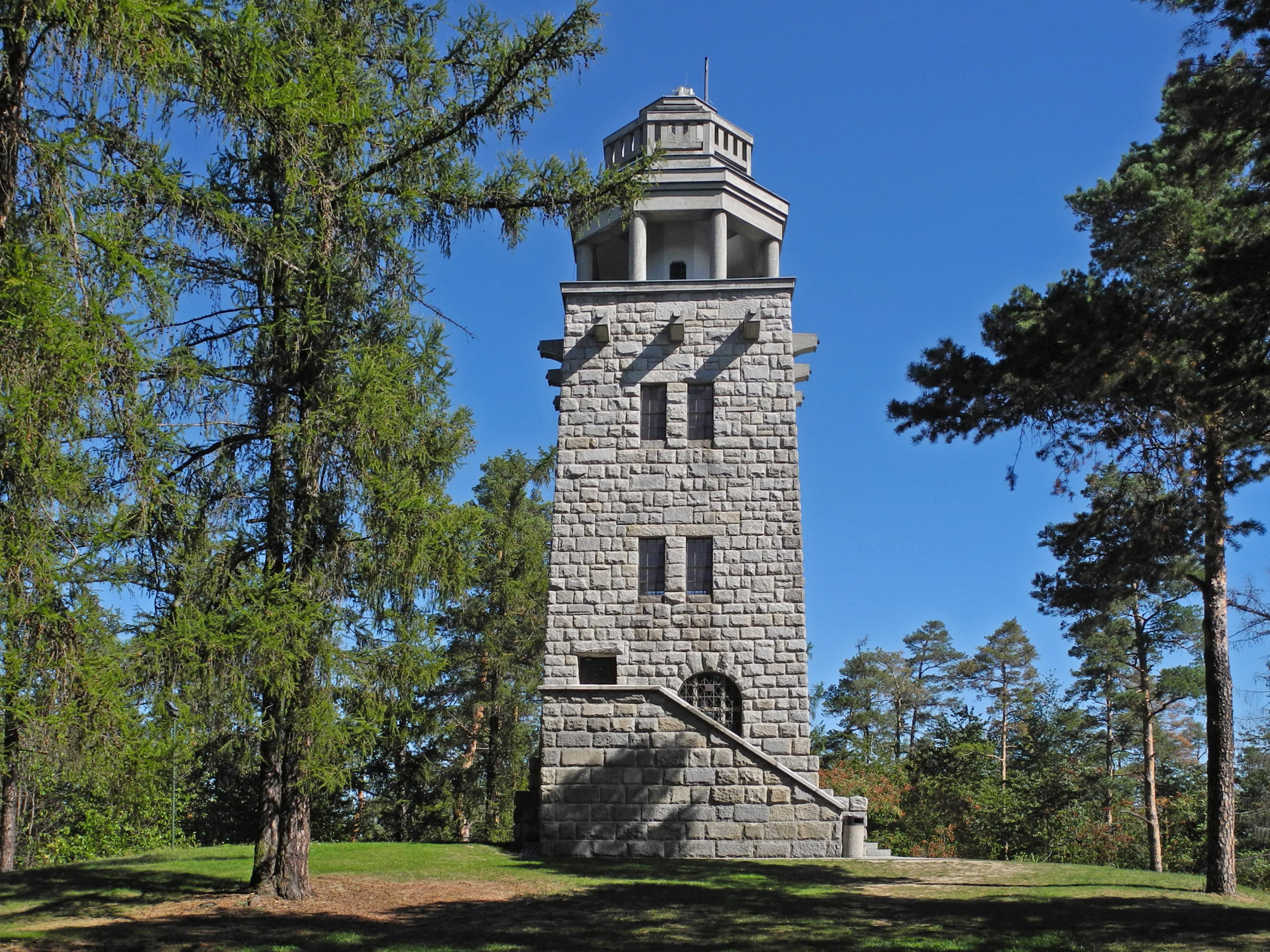
Hans Kudlich Observation Tower

The main landmark of Úvalno is the Church of Saint Nicholas. It was originally a Gothic church from the second half of the 14th century, rebuilt in the Baroque style in 1762.

Hans Kudlich Observation Tower is situated on a hill above the village. It is a brick tower, built in 1912–1913 in honour of Hans Kudlich, a native of Úvalno. A cultural monument is also the grave and memorial of Hans Kudlich at the local cemetery.

== Notable people ==
- Hans Kudlich (1823–1917), Austrian political activist, writer and medical doctor

== Twin towns – sister cities ==
Úvalno is twinned with:

- Branice, Poland
