= Robot Patent =

Historical labour rent in the Habsburg Empire

The Robot Patent is an English-language scholarly term for the imperial decrees (patents) in the 1700s abolishing compulsory labor (robot (Note: The word robot in this context is formed from the Slovak word robota, meaning "labor" in literary Slovak.)) of serfs, issued by Joseph II, Holy Roman Emperor, who had carried out a register of all land with a division between peasant and noble holdings. Joseph II outlawed the buying of 'rustic' land by the nobility and at the same time giving the rusticalists security of tenure. His motive was to prevent the increase in 'dominical' land, which paid fewer taxes to the government. This led to the survival of the peasantry, with rustic land still having the robot. In 1789 it was abolished by Joseph II, but Leopold II restored it when his brother Joseph II died in 1790. The abolition of the Robot during the Revolutions of 1848 broke the last legal tie which held the peasants to the land, and was seen as a great victory by the peasants.

When the Robot Patent was ended, the landlords had no interest in keeping peasantry to the soil. The smaller peasants sold their land and moved into the cities. The larger landlords could now run their great estates more economically. However the small gentry were ruined; they could not run estates even with the robot compensation as it was far too little, in contrast with Hungarian nobles who owned mills, paper factories, and coal mines, all gained by the much larger compensation paid to them.

== See also ==
- Maria Theresa
- Manorialism
- Serfdom
- Serfdom Patent (1781)
