= Ernst Friedrich von Holtzmann =

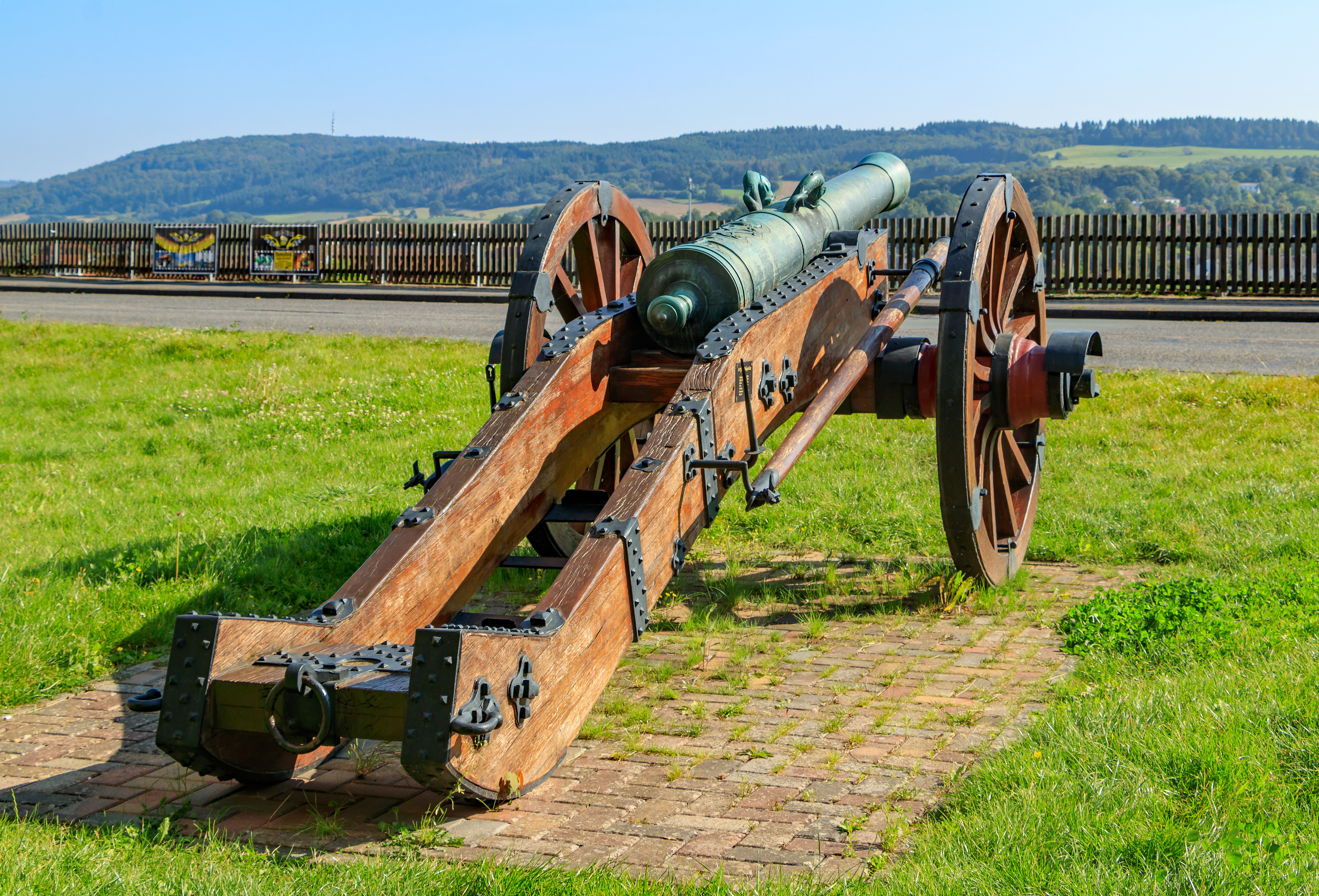
- Large caliber cannon from 1788 at Homberg (Efze), Hesse, Germany
- Died: 16 October 1759; Berlin, modern Germany
- Military career
- Allegiance: Prussia
- Branch: Artillery
- Rank: Colonel
- Conflicts: War of the Austrian Succession; Bohemian campaign of 1744; Seven Years' War
- Awards: Pour le Mérite, 1741
- Other work: Raised to nobility, 1741

Ernst Friedrich von Holtzmann (d. 16 October 1759) served in the Prussian Army during the War of the Austrian Succession and Seven Years' War as an artillery expert and inventor. He developed many of the technical improvements in the Prussian artillery before and during the reign of Frederick the Great, some of which were copied by the artilleries of other nations. Because of his efforts, he and his two brothers were raised to the nobility in 1741. Among his inventions were the screw quoin to elevate the gun barrel and the limber ammunition chest.

== Military career ==
Ernst Friedrich Holtzmann was the son of Major Johann Heinrich Holtzmann (d. 1724) who was a fireworks master of the artillery. Ernst Holtzmann took up his father's profession by joining the Prussian Army artillery in 1711. He was elevated in rank to sous-lieutenant on 25 February 1718 and to first lieutenant in 1723. He was promoted to second captain and fireworks master in 1729. Skipping the rank of first captain, Holtzmann was promoted major and then lieutenant colonel on 14 November 1741. Also in 1741, he was awarded the Pour le Mérite by King Frederick II of Prussia. He was appointed commander of the newly created 2nd Artillery Battalion in 1741 and became a full colonel in 1747. Previously, there had been only one artillery battalion with six companies. On 11 April 1741, Holtzmann and his brothers Johann Heinrich and George Ludwig were raised to the nobility by the king.

Frederick the Great had a strained relationship with his artillerymen and engineers. Officers in those fields were widely regarded as bourgeoisie technicians, unlike the aristocratic officers of the infantry and cavalry. Frederick even encouraged his noble officers to treat the artillery and engineer officers as inferiors. Frederick rarely gave any credit to his artillery officers in his battle reports or gave them awards or honors, so it was unusual that Holtzmann and his brothers were ennobled. There was no official artillery chief under Fredrick, though Christian Nicolaus von Linger served in an unofficial capacity. Later, Karl Wilhelm von Dieskau took over the role, though he was a mere lieutenant colonel until he was promoted major general in 1762.

In the Bohemian campaign of 1744 during the War of the Austrian Succession, Frederick invaded Bohemia, a possession of Habsburg Austria. The Prussian invading columns counted 71,843 men, 182 field artillery pieces and 56 siege guns. In the Siege of Prague, the Prussians quickly captured the city. After this victory, Frederick overextended his army and was outmaneuvered by an Austro-Saxon army. In late November, Frederick was forced to order Gottfried Emanuel von Einsiedel to abandon Prague. Einsiedel was acquitted by a court-martial for abandoning the siege guns and for failing to blow up the fortifications. The proceedings included testimony that Linger and Holtzmann concluded it was impossible to remove all the artillery because there were not enough horses available.

Holtzmann was promoted to colonel on 14 May 1747. During the Seven Years' War, he commanded the artillery belonging to Hans von Lehwaldt's corps. Later, he led the artillery in Christoph II von Dohna's corps in the northeast. Holtzmann died in Berlin on 16 October 1759.

== Innovations ==
Photo shows a cannon from the 1870s at right and a limber at left. Holtzmann designed a limber that included an ammunition box.

In 1731, Linger reduced Prussian cannons to four calibers. They were named 3-pounders, 6-pounders, 12-pounders, and 24-pounders, according to the weight of the round shot they fired. Cannons were very heavy, so in order to make them lighter and more mobile, an effort was made to provide a smaller chamber at the base of the gun barrel to accommodate the gunpowder charge. These were the so-called chambered guns. During the reign of Frederick William I of Prussia, Holtzmann designed a chambered 24-pounder that was not as heavy as the standard gun. He also designed other chambered guns which were introduced in 1740. The chambered guns were not successful because it was difficult for the gunners to force the gunpowder cartridges into the smaller chamber at the end of the bore.

Among Holtzmann's many innovations, the screw quoin and the limber ammunition box were perhaps the two most notable. Holtzmann spent his own money to design a caisson limber. The limber was the two-wheeled vehicle upon which the trail of the cannon rested while the cannon was being pulled. Holtzmann placed an ammunition box on the limber which allowed the gunners an easy way to resupply their ammunition without having to rely on the ammunition cart. It worked so well that in 1742 Frederick ordered it to be employed with all of his 3-pounders and 6-pounders.

In 1743, Holtzmann was placed in charge of the Wrocław (Breslau) cannon foundry. He expanded the facility and was partly responsible for the production of 444 new artillery pieces between 1741 and 1745. Also in 1743, he designed the new 10-pounder howitzer. Previously, the only howitzer employed by the Prussian army was the 18-pounder. In 1744, he designed a new 18-pounder howitzer. His efforts led to a new 7-pounder howitzer being adopted in 1758.

Cannon barrels in the mid-1700s were elevated or depressed by the use of a quoin. This was a wedge that was hammered in or pulled out, which was a not very accurate way to elevate a gun. In 1747, Holtzmann invented a new kind of wedge that could be adjusted by turning a screw. The screw quoin was a great improvement over the quoin. It was later copied by the Austrians and the Russians. The Prussians called the screw quoin a rechtsmachine. Holtzmann also designed a gun sight for the light 12-pounder cannons designed by Dieskau.
