= Gottfried Emanuel von Einsiedel =

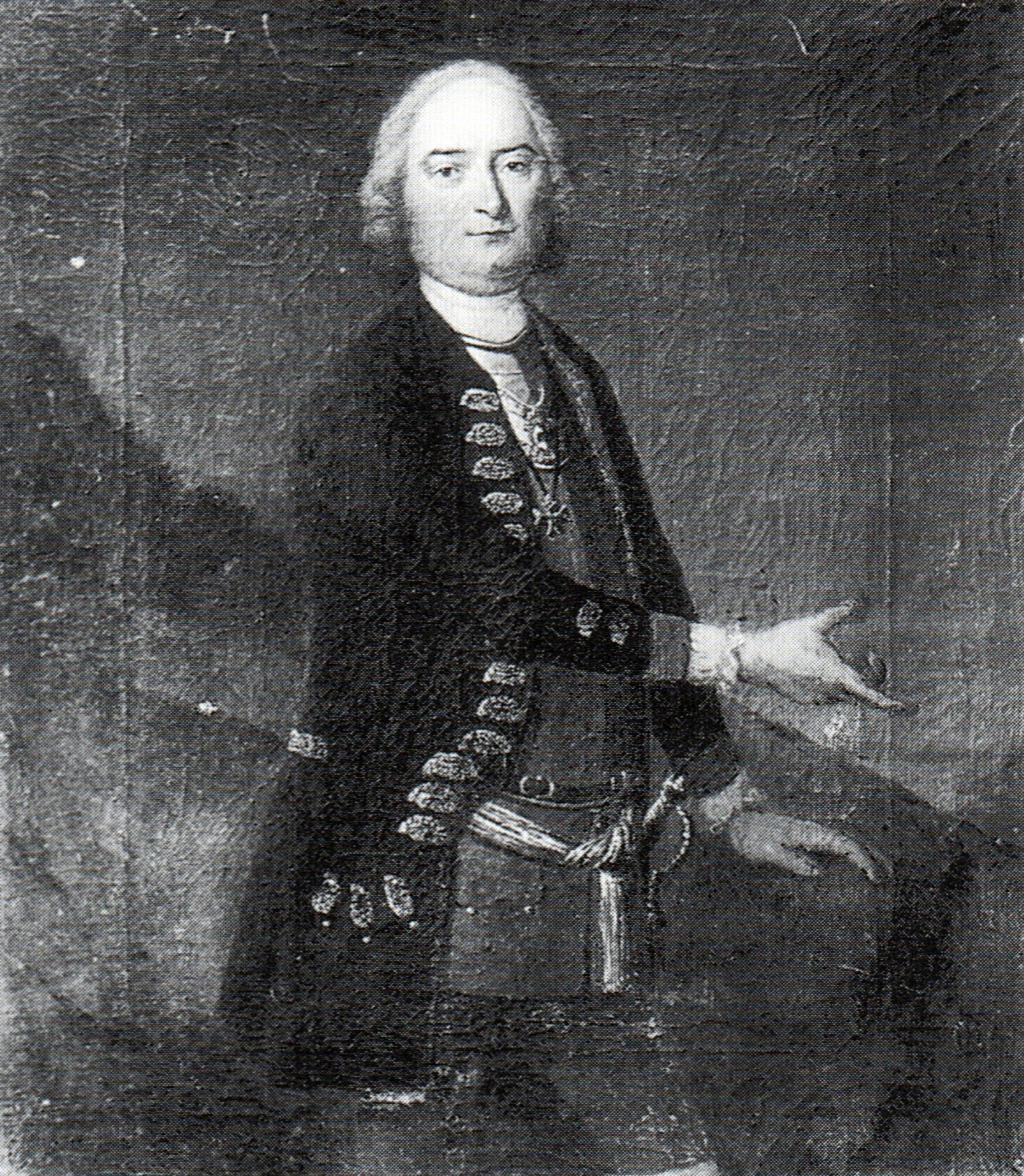
- Gottfried Emanuel von Einsiedel
- Born: 14 April 1690; Mansfeld Land (Vatterode), Saxony-Anhalt, Germany
- Died: 14 October 1745 (aged 55) Potsdam, modern Germany
- Allegiance: Prussia
- Branch: Infantry
- Rank: Lieutenant General
- Conflicts: Great Northern War; War of the Austrian Succession; Bohemian campaign of 1744
- Awards: Order of the Black Eagle
- Other work: Chef Grenadier-Garde Battalion Nr. 6

Gottfried Emanuel von Einsiedel (14 April 1690 – 14 October 1745) served in the Prussian Army as a lieutenant general during the War of the Austrian Succession. He was a member of the landed aristocracy. He joined the army as a member of the Potsdam Giants during the reign of King Frederick William I of Prussia. He became a favorite of the king and was rapidly promoted. After Frederick II became king in 1740, Einsiedel was promoted to major general and appointed proprietor of the Grenadier-Garde Battalion. In 1744, he was made commander of the garrison of Prague. During the Prussian defeat in the Bohemian campaign of 1744, Einsiedel led his troops in a costly and difficult retreat through the mountains. He was hauled before a court-martial but was acquitted and died soon after.

== Early career ==
Gottfried Emanuel von Einsiedel was born on 14 April 1690 in the village of Vatterode in Mansfeld Land. His father was Haubold von Einsiedel, a district governor in the Duchy of Saxe-Weissenfels, and his mother was Katharina Maria von Spitznasen. In 1707, Gottfried Einsiedel joined the Potsdam Giants, the bodyguard of King Frederick William I of Prussia. By 1715, he was a first lieutenant and served in the Great Northern War, fighting in the campaign that included the Battles of Usedom and Stresow and the Siege of Stralsund. He was promoted to captain on 30 April 1723 and was appointed bailiff of Derenburg near Halberstadt. He was promoted again to lieutenant colonel and became close to the king, being one of a group of officers allowed to sit at the king's sickbed.

Einsiedel had gained the favor of Frederick William I by fighting a duel on the king's behalf. The king assigned Einsiedel the duty of examining the weapons produced by the firearms factory. In 1726, Frederick William I transferred ownership of the Wartenburg house in Potsdam to Einsiedel. Since a permit to brew beer and serve spirits came with the property, Einsiedel became a brewer and innkeeper and also opened a restaurant. The workers hired from Liège to operate the firearms factory enjoyed the brandy served at the restaurant. After Einsiedel's death, the property was bought by the sculptor Johann Peter Benkert who named the restaurant Zum Einsiedler. The place stayed in business, even becoming a popular wedding venue, until it was destroyed by British bombing in 1945 during World War II.

== General officer ==
1730 Map of Prague shows fortifications on both banks of the Vltava (Moldau).

In 1740, Frederick II became king and appointed Einsiedel major general and Chef (proprietor) of the Grenadier-Garde Regiment Nr. 6. (This unit was the successor to the Potsdam Giants.) During 1741, Einsiedel remained in camp at Genthin with Leopold I, Prince of Anhalt-Dessau, who was known as the Old Dessauer. In 1744, Einsiedel was promoted to lieutenant general and in August that year he received the Order of the Black Eagle. On 14 August 1744, Frederick invaded the Austrian territory of Bohemia, thus starting the Second Silesian War. The Prussian army began the Siege of Prague and swiftly obtained the city's surrender on 16 September 1744. Immediately, the Prussians began impressing local inhabitants into their army.

Einsiedel was left in Prague to command a garrison of 5,000 Prussians and the siege artillery. There were 56 heavy cannon in the Prussian siege train. In the Bohemian campaign of 1744, Frederick allowed his army to become overextended by capturing too much Bohemian territory in late September and early October. Frederick's other faults were inadequate logistical support and failure to anticipate the Electorate of Saxony switching sides. The main Austro-Saxon army led by Prince Charles Alexander of Lorraine and his deputy Otto Ferdinand von Abensperg und Traun consistently outmaneuvered Frederick, forcing his army north of the Elbe River by 8 November. When the Austro-Saxon army breached the Elbe defense line on 19 November, Frederick was compelled to abandon Bohemia and evacuate Prague.

Frederick ordered Einsiedel to abandon Prague after spiking his siege guns and blowing up the fortifications. The guns were spiked but the fortifications only suffered minor damage. On 26 November 1744, the Austrian light troops and Pandurs swarmed into Prague to harass the rearguard as it exited the city. Einsiedel's column reached the Prussian magazine at Litoměřice (Leitmeritz) where it left non-transportable wagons and guns. From there, the column marched east into the mountains, hounded by the Austrian light troops. The Bohemians impressed into the Prussian army began deserting. On 9 December, Einsiedel found his column blocked by a Saxon force under Johann Georg, Chevalier de Saxe. In this situation, more soldiers deserted but Einseidel led his remaining men onto little-used roads. On 16 December, the survivors were rescued by a column under Ernst Christoph von Nassau near Frýdlant (Friedland in Böhmen).

== Court-martial and death ==
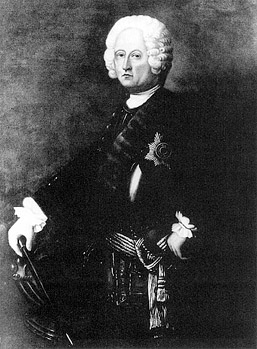
Christian von Linger

Frederick was apt to blame unsuccessful commanders, and so it was with Einsiedel. He was brought before a court-martial in 1745. The court noted that during the evacuation of Prague, Einsiedel was unable to mount a horse because he was ill with a "notorious indisposition". All the abandoned cannons were spiked. According to the testimony of Christian Nicolaus von Linger, there was enough time for the Austrians to drill new touch holes and fire two guns at the retreating Prussians, though no one was killed. Some demolitions were carried out but the fortifications remained mostly intact. Einsiedel was charged with leaving behind 18 mortars and 36 limbers and caissons. The court noted that of the 1,892 horses needed to move the artillery, only 380 could be collected. Einsiedel consulted with Linger, Gerhard Cornelius von Walrave, Hans Christoph Friedrich Graf von Hacke, and Friedrich Rudolf von Rothenburg and decided to haul away the pontoons, the sick soldiers, and the military chest. The decision to leave the siege guns and the baggage due to the shortage of horses and harness equipment was confirmed by Linger and Ernst Friedrich von Holtzmann. The pontoons were taken but had to be destroyed at Litoměřice due to the loss of horses on the march. The court found that Einsiedel was innocent of failing to remove more artillery and equipment from Prague.

The most serious charge against Einsiedel was his failure to blow up the fortifications. The engineers refused to be responsible for lighting the fuses, which meant the artillerymen had to do it. Walrave testified that he ordered Major (Wilhelm) Steuben to light the fuses after the garrison marched out of the city. (Note: Major Steuben was the father of Friedrich Wilhelm von Steuben.) Einsiedel argued that the teams carrying out the demolitions would be captured. He said he had to hide the imminent retreat from Prague's inhabitants and that there was not enough time to prepare the walls for destruction in the time permitted. Also, the premature destruction of the walls might have resulted in harm to his own soldiers. Rothenburg offered to march three battalions back into the city to blow up the walls. Einsiedel declined to do this on the grounds that the men might break ranks and desert or plunder the city. The last charge against Einsiedel was his decision to take the pontoons instead of the siege artillery. He argued that he did not know if the bridge over the Elbe at Litoměřice was still intact and needed the pontoons to cross the river. The court decided that Einsiedel's actions were all justified.

Einsiedel died on 14 October 1745 at Potsdam. He was survived by his wife Margarethe von Rochow. He was succeeded as the Chef of Infantry Regiment Nr. 6 by Wolf Frederick von Retzow. A rumor persisted for over a century that Einsiedel was secretly beheaded for his failure at Prague. In 1857, King Frederick William IV had the body disinterred and the skull was found still attached to the rest of the corpse, thus disproving the rumor of a beheading.

== Notes ==
Footnotes

Citations

Military offices
Preceded by none	Chef of Infantry Regiment Nr. 6; 1740–1745	Succeeded by Wolf Frederick von Retzow
