= Bohemian campaign of 1744 =

- Part of War of the Austrian Succession
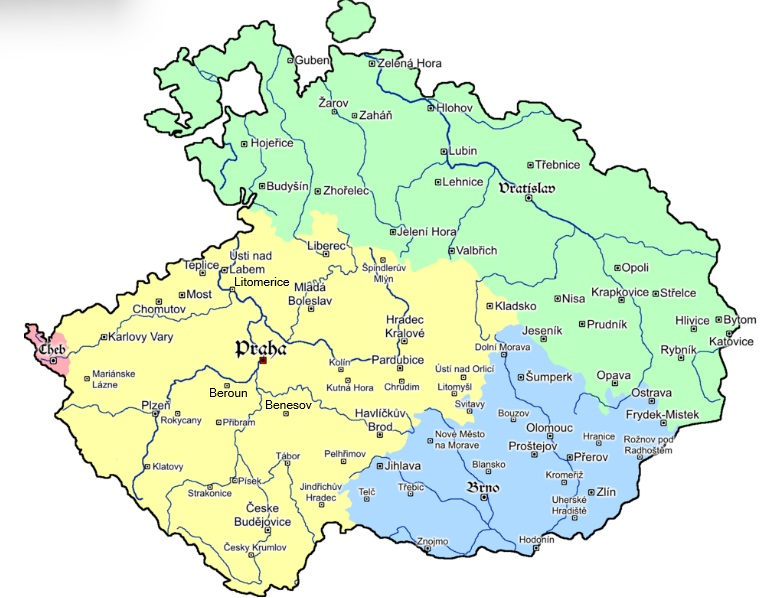
- Map shows Bohemia (yellow), Moravia (blue), and Silesia (green).
| Date | 14 August 1744 – January 1745 |
| Location | Kingdom of Bohemia (now the Czech Republic) |
| Result | Austrian victory |

Belligerents
| Habsburg monarchy Saxony | Prussia |

Commanders and leaders
| (Habsburg monarchy) Charles of Lorraine (Habsburg monarchy) Otto von Traun (Electorate of Saxony) Johann Adolf of Saxe-Weissenfels | (Kingdom of Prussia) Frederick II (Kingdom of Prussia) Kurt von Schwerin (Kingdom of Prussia) Leopold II of Anhalt-Dessau |

Strength
| 108,563, 197 guns | 71,843–80,000, 182 field guns, 56 siege guns |

Casualties and losses
| | 10,000–30,000, 56 siege guns |

The Bohemian campaign of 1744 (14 August 1744 – January 1745) was fought between the Prussian army commanded by King Frederick II and the Habsburg Austrian army led by Prince Charles Alexander of Lorraine. The Austrians were assisted by a corps from the Electorate of Saxony. In August 1744, the Prussian army invaded the Habsburg territory of Bohemia. Frederick planned to seize part or all of Bohemia while Austria's main army under Prince Charles Alexander of Lorraine was far away in Alsace. The Prussian army concluded the Siege of Prague in September and quickly occupied the eastern half of Bohemia.

Prince Charles' army evacuated Alsace and marched rapidly across southern Germany. It joined Károly József Batthyány's Bohemian army and a Saxon corps. Assisted by Otto Ferdinand von Abensperg und Traun, Prince Charles outmaneuvered Frederick, steadily compelling him to withdraw from territory that the Prussians occupied. The Austrian Pandurs and hussars constantly harassed the Prussians, capturing messengers and wiping out foraging detachments. The Austrians first pushed Frederick behind the Elbe River then they forced their way across the river in mid-November. Frederick was compelled to abandon Prague and evacuate Bohemia. The Prussian army's logistical support and discipline broke down during the retreat and 10,000 to 30,000 men were lost to desertion, capture, or death.

== Background ==
The First Silesian War, part of the War of the Austrian Succession, ended on 28 July 1742 when King Frederick II of Prussia and Queen Maria Theresa of the Habsburg monarchy signed the Treaty of Breslau. By this agreement, Austria formally recognized Prussia's capture of Lower and Upper Silesia and the County of Kladsko (Glatz). Frederick's abandonment of his allies stunned Europe's leaders because it left Austria free to deal with its remaining enemies. Frederick increased Prussia's population from 2.2 million to 3.2 million but other nations realized that Frederick was not trustworthy.

During the two years of peace, King Frederick II increased his army's strength to 94,500 infantry and 29,200 cavalry. In January 1744, Frederick covertly made preparations to re-enter the war against Austria by gaining the cooperation of the Electorate of Bavaria, Electoral Palatinate and Landgraviate of Hesse-Kassel. He also reopened secret talks with France that resulted in the Treaty of Paris, which was signed on 5 June 1744. Frederick was afraid that if Austria won the war, the Habsburgs would try to reconquer Silesia. As part of the Treaty of Paris, Frederick promised to invade Bohemia with 80,000 troops in August. France would mount an offensive against the Austrian Netherlands while stationing an army in Alsace. France pledged to pursue any Austrian forces moving to defend Bohemia. Frederick agreed to hand over some of conquered Bohemia to Charles VII, Holy Roman Emperor while acquiring choice territories for Prussia.

In the winter of 1743, Maria Theresa determined to invade French possessions along the Rhine River. Though the province of Alsace was part of France, most Alsatians still spoke German, so seizing this area became her goal. Her husband Francis Stephen was from nearby Lorraine which, by treaty, would become part of France when the former King of Poland Stanisław Leszczyński died. Some of Maria Theresa's councilors advised her that invading Alsace was unwise while Frederick's intentions were unknown but she wrote to one of her generals, "Do not let yourself be troubled by the King of Prussia; do not think of him".

== Prelude ==
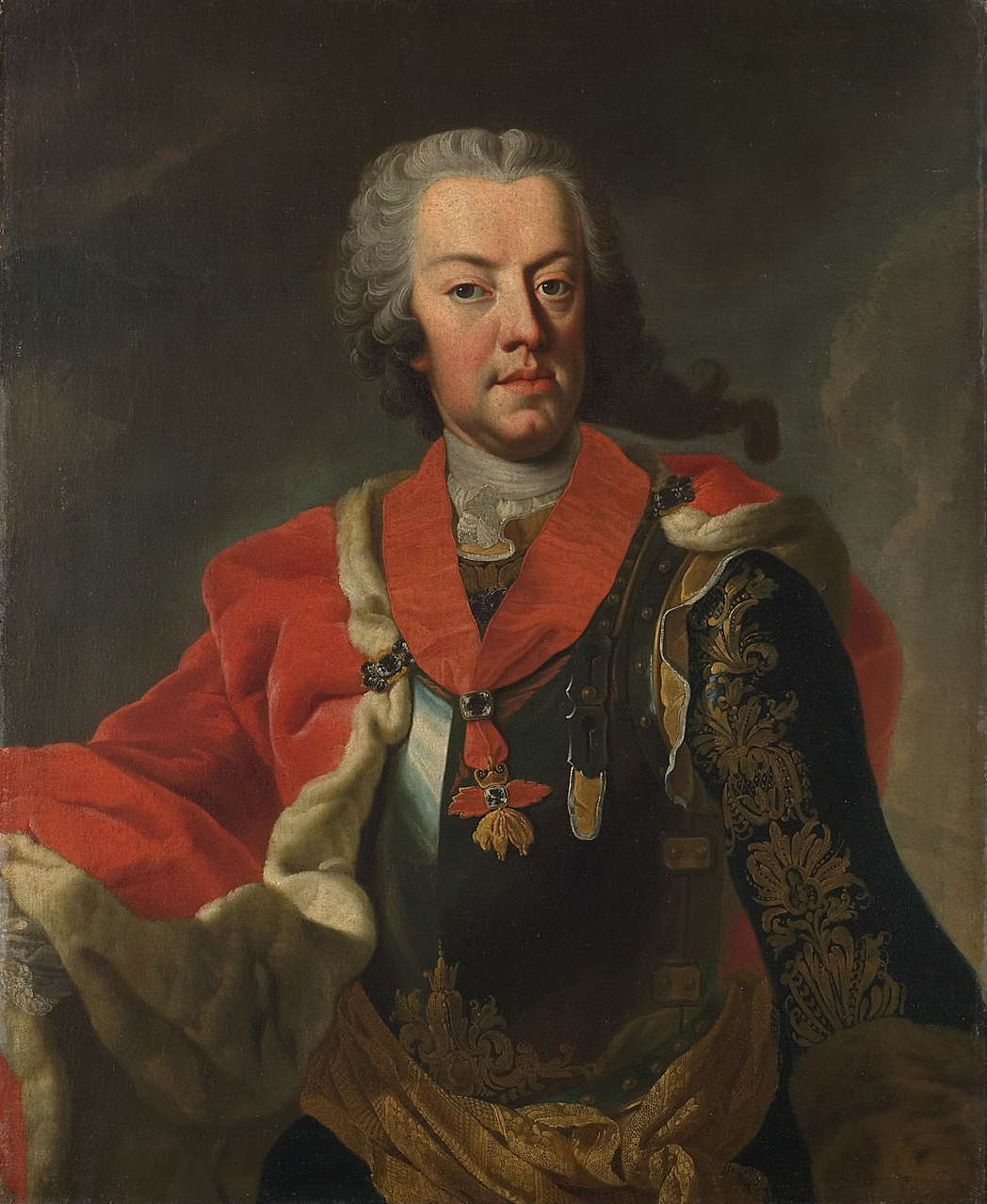
Charles of Lorraine

The French Army of Flanders invaded the Austrian Netherlands on 17 May 1744. The Barrier Treaty called for Dutch soldiers to garrison the fortresses in the Austrian Netherlands, despite the fact that France and the Dutch Republic were officially at peace. In June, the French army forced the Dutch garrisons to surrender at Menin, Ypres and Fort Knokke. The garrison of Veurne (Furnes) capitulated on 11 July. Field Marshal Prince Charles Alexander of Lorraine outmaneuvered Marshal François de Franquetot de Coigny and put 60,000 Austrian soldiers across the Rhine on 2 July 1744. The Battle of Wissembourg was fought on 5 July.

The French government responded to the threat by sending an army of 32,000 men under Marshal Adrien Maurice de Noailles, 3rd Duke of Noailles marching toward Alsace. The campaign in Flanders was suspended and Maurice de Saxe was left with 55,000 men. On 12 July 1744, King Frederick II received news that Prince Charles was in Alsace. The Austrian government belatedly realized Frederick's intentions. On 5 August, Vienna warned its local army commander General of the Cavalry Károly József Batthyány that Prussia was ready to attack. Three days later, Prince Charles received the same message plus instructions to start sending his army east to fight the Prussians. On 14 August, 80,000 Prussians began crossing the border into Bohemia.

== Invasion ==
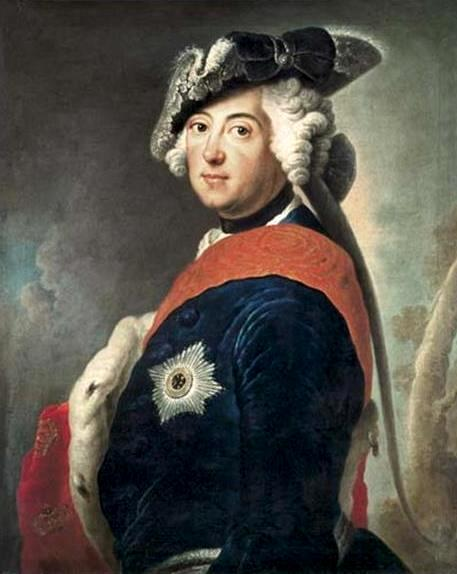
Frederick II of Prussia

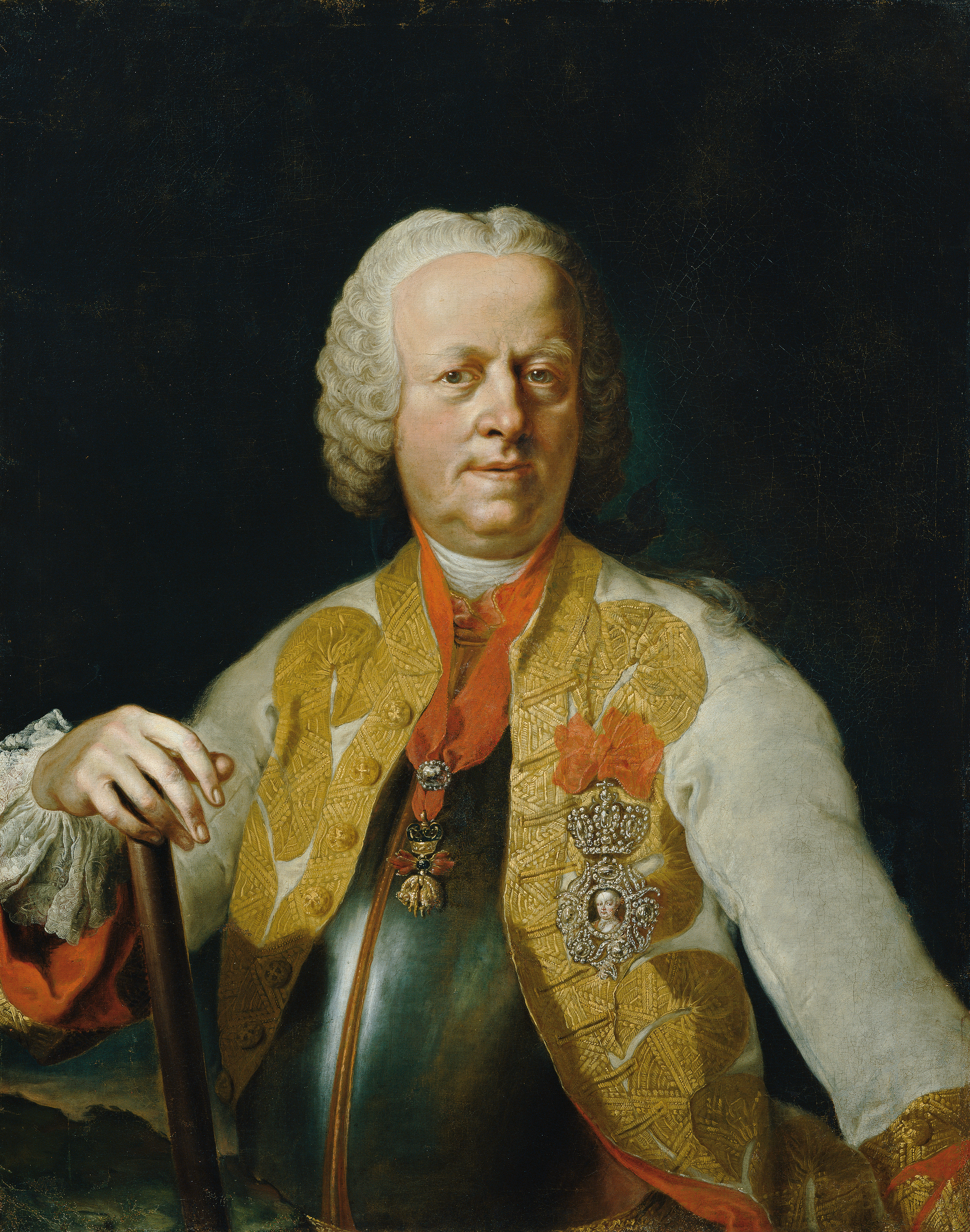
Károly Batthyány

The Prussian invasion ignited what is known as the Second Silesian War. King Frederick commanded the main 40,000-man army that entered Bohemia from the north. Field Marshal Leopold II, Prince of Anhalt-Dessau (Young Dessauer) led a 16,000-strong Prussian column into Bohemia from the northeast and 16,000 Prussians under Field Marshal Kurt Christoph Graf von Schwerin entered Bohemia farther east.

Frederick's and Prince Leopold's forces violated the territory of the Electorate of Saxony while Schwerin's column started from Kłodzko (Glatz). Frederick's army entered Bohemia by the Elbe valley and marched via Teplice (Toplitz) and Lovosice (Lobositz). Leopold's column started at Bautzen (Budyšin) and met with Frederick's army at Litoměřice (Leitmeritz). Schwerin's column entered Bohemia at Broumov (Braunau) and marched east. A 20,000-man army was placed east of Kłodzko as a threat to Moravia and the fortress of Olomouc (Olmutz). The Moravian army was directed by Lieutenant General (Lt Gen) Heinrich Karl von der Marwitz.

In August 1744, Batthyány's army of 21,000 Austrians was posted in the Upper Palatinate. Batthyány marched east into Bohemia with 12,000 soldiers and established his force at Beroun (Beraun) southwest of Prague. Frederick's main army was accompanied on the Elbe by 480 boats carrying his heavy artillery and supplies. The Prussians converged on Prague, with Schwerin's column arriving near the city on 31 August 1744 and the main Prussian army reaching it on 1 September. Frederick ordered General Hans Christoph Friedrich Graf von Hacke and 6,000 men to Beroun. On 5 September, there was a minor battle at Beroun in which the Prussians fought their way out with the help of a relief column. After this clash, Batthyány based his army farther southwest at Plzeň (Pilsen)

Reed Browning asserted that 80,000 Prussians invaded Bohemia. Browning's three invading columns totaled 72,000. Gaston Bodart claimed that Prague was besieged by 80,000 Prussians. David G. Chandler stated that the three main Prussian invading columns counted 71,843 men, 182 field artillery pieces and 56 siege guns. During the campaign, the Austrians would employ 108,563 soldiers supported by 197 field guns.

== Prussian offensive ==
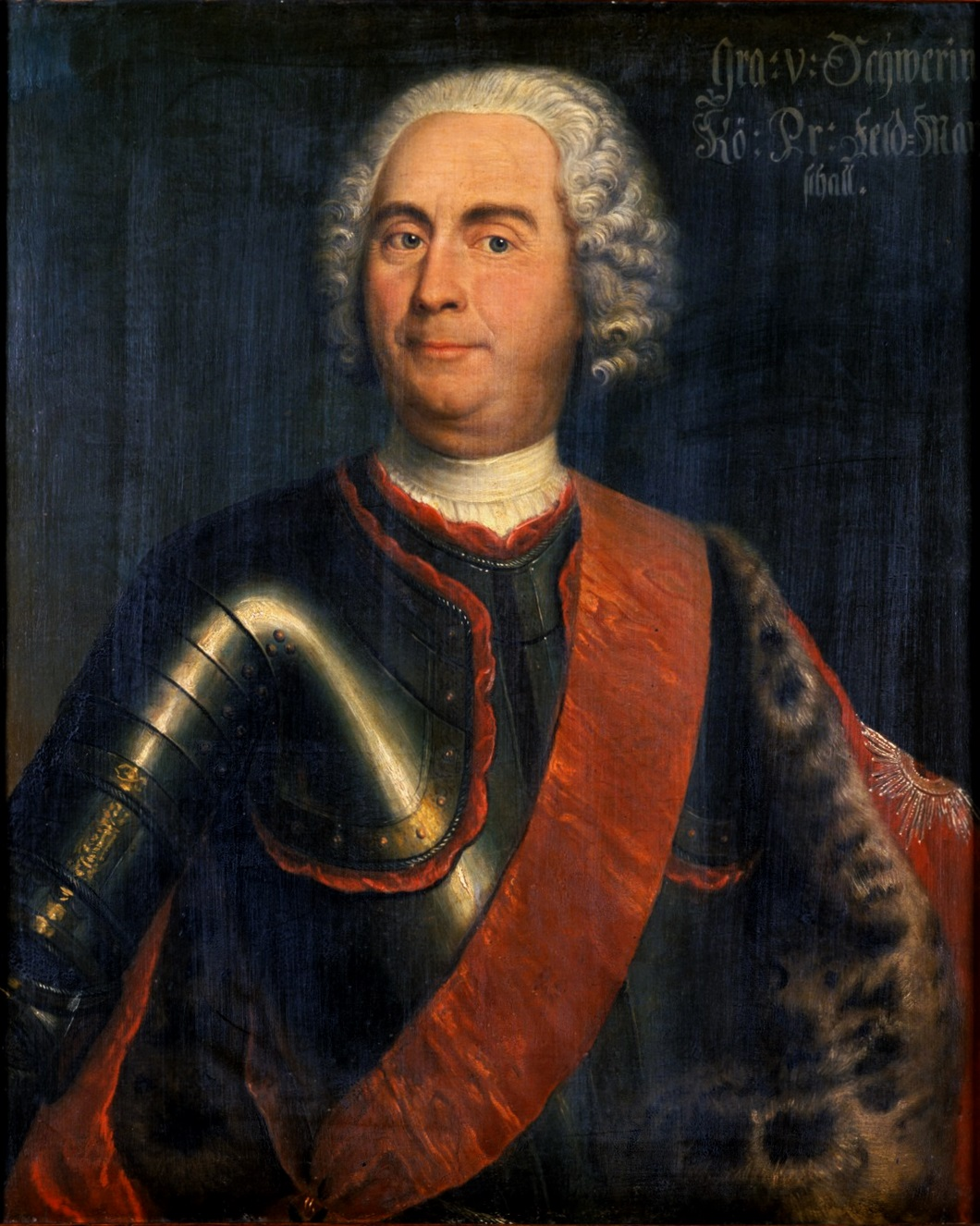
Kurt von Schwerin

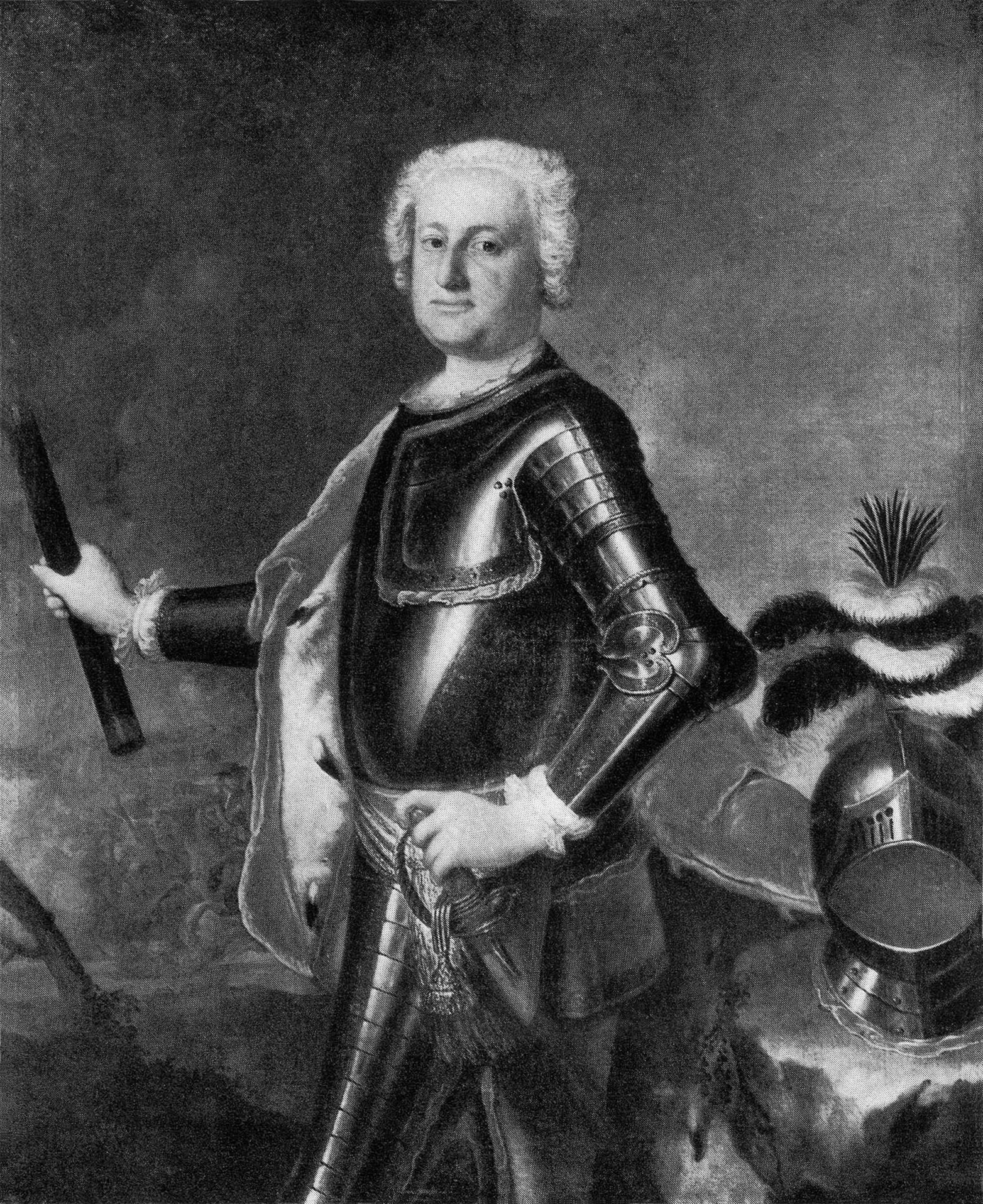
Leopold II of Anhalt-Dessau (Young Dessauer)

According to Bodart, Frederick's 80,000 Prussians concluded the Siege of Prague between 6 and 16 September 1744. The city was defended by 14,900 Austrians, including 4,400 regulars and 10,500 militia. Austrian losses numbered 1,400 killed and wounded, plus 13,500 men, 116 guns, and 14 mortars captured. Prussian casualties were only 150 killed and wounded but included Frederick's cousin Margrave Friedrich Wilhelm of Brandenburg-Schwedt killed. Browning stated that Prague's garrison numbered 17,000 men. The Prussians imposed a ransom of 200,000 pounds sterling on the city.

Starting on 17 September, the Prussian army began moving south from Prague on the east bank of the Vltava (Moldau) River. Lt Gen Gottfried Emanuel von Einsiedel was left in Prague with 5,000 Prussians and the siege artillery. Lt Gen Ernst Christoph von Nassau was sent ahead with the advance guard. The remainder of the Prussian army moved in two columns with the Young Dessauer leading the western column nearest the river while Schwerin's eastern column, usually accompanied by Frederick, followed the main road from Prague to Tábor. Schwerin's column reached the Sázava River on 21 September, Bystřice (Bistritz) on 22 September, Miličín (Miltschin) on 26 September and Tábor on 27 September. At Tábor the two main Prussian columns rendezvoused and the army rested for two days.

The Prussian supply wagons encountered difficulty and only half the supplies arrived at Tábor. Another problem occurred when Batthyány unleashed his Pandurs (Croats) and hussars. These light troops constantly harassed the Prussians, attacking foraging detachments and capturing messengers. Whenever the Pandurs were met with force, they fled out of range but soon returned to annoy the Prussians. On 2 October, the Prussians occupied Hluboká nad Vltavou (Frauenberg). Nassau and the advance guard captured České Budějovice (Budweis) and Frederick faced a dilemma. Schwerin wanted to seize Jindřichův Hradec (Neuhaus) to the southeast, threatening Vienna, while the Young Dessauer wanted to make the main thrust south to České Budějovice to threaten Linz. Frederick opted to move the main army to České Budějovice while also occupying Jindřichův Hradec with a smaller force.

== Austrian counteroffensive ==
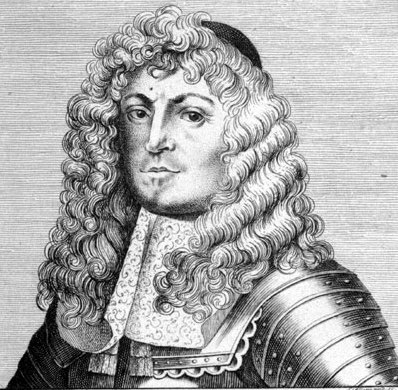
Otto von Traun

On 23 August 1744, the army of Prince Charles recrossed the Rhine, unmolested by the French, because King Louis XV fell ill with smallpox. Prince Charles marched across southern Germany with remarkable speed. Instead of marching in pursuit, the French army began the Siege of Fribourg in the Breisgau. The garrison of Fribourg resisted until 25 November. The French assigned Lt Gen Friedrich Heinrich von Seckendorff and an army of Bavarians, Palatines and Hessians to follow Prince Charles. Seckendorff mounted a leisurely pursuit and then turned aside to liberate Bavaria after it was abandoned by Feldmarschall-Leutnant (FML) Johann Leopold Bärnklau and its Austrian occupying force. On 22 October, Seckendorff recaptured Munich. On 26 September, Prince Charles reached Waldmünchen on the Bohemian border. On 2 October, Prince Charles merged his army with Batthyány's, making a combined army of 55,000. During the campaign, Prince Charles was ably assisted by Field Marshal Otto Ferdinand von Abensperg und Traun who plotted the Austrian strategy to evict the Prussians from Bohemia.

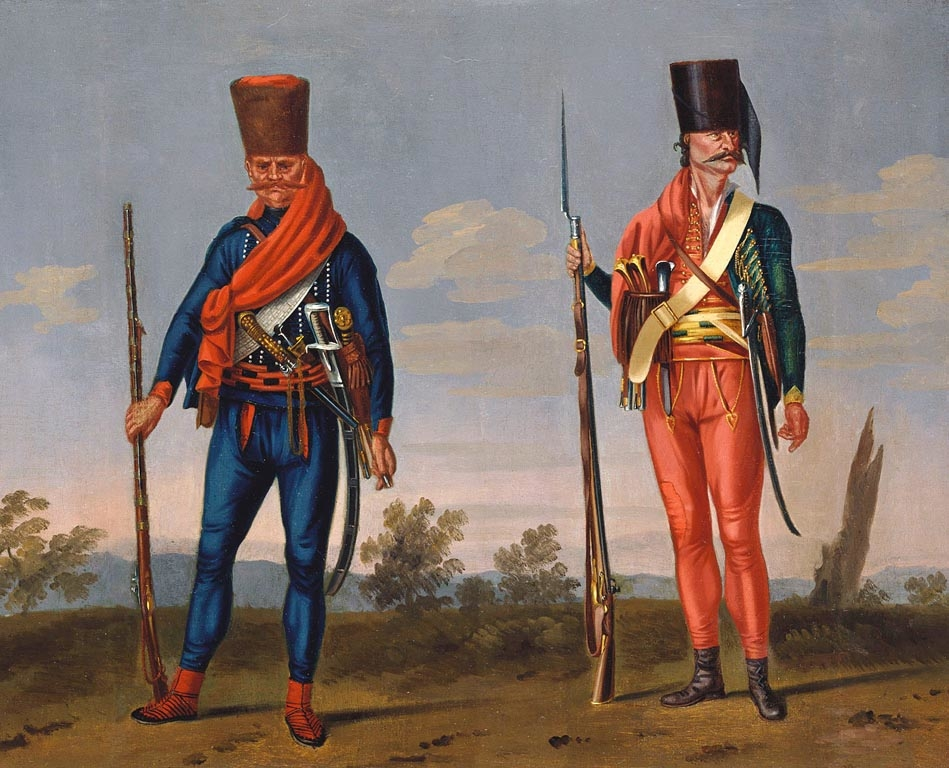
Borderer (l) and Pandur (r), 1748

Several events coincided to assist Austria's cause. Saxony, formerly allied with Prussia, switched sides and offered Austria a corps of 20,000 soldiers. On 11 August 1744, the Kingdom of Great Britain paid 150,000 pounds sterling to Austria to enlist 20,000 additional soldiers. Maria Theresa went to Bratislava and extracted a promise of 25,000 troops from the Kingdom of Hungary. The Bohemian nobles and peasants, apathetic during the 1742 invasion, resisted the Prussians. Lt Gen Johann Adolf II, Duke of Saxe-Weissenfels led 20,000 Saxons into Bohemia via Cheb (Eger).

On 4 October 1744, Frederick's army crossed to the west bank of the Vltava at Týn nad Vltavou (Moldau-Tein) after receiving a false rumor that Prince Charles' army was nearby. After searching in vain, Frederick returned to Týn nad Vltavou (north of České Budějovice) only to receive an accurate report that Prince Charles' army crossed the Vltava farther north. As Frederick's main army marched north to Bechyně (Bechin), his 2,000-man rearguard at Týn nad Vltavou was attacked by a large force of Pandurs on 9 October. The Prussians, led by Colonel Hans Joachim von Zieten, repulsed the Austrian attack, but a wagon convoy only escaped by throwing their load of bread into the river. From 14 to 18 October, Frederick's army moved north toward Benešov (Beneschau) leaving behind garrisons in České Budějovice, Tábor, and Hluboká nad Vltavou. The Pandurs wiped out a 200-man detachment of Prussians at Milevsko (Mühlhausen) but an attack on Tábor by FML Franz Leopold von Nádasdy was repelled.

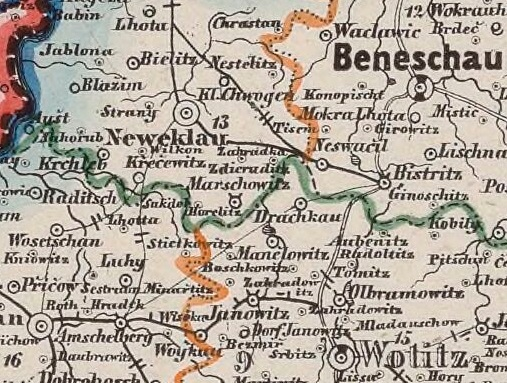
Map shows the Beneschau (Benešov) area with Raditsch (Radíč) at left, Marschowitz (Maršovice) at center, Konopischt (Konopiště) near Beneschau.

On 18 October 1744, Frederick's army established the entrenched Camp of Konopischt on the eastern side of Benešov. The Prussians maintained the camp for eight days. Realizing that the garrisons of České Budějovice, Tábor, and Hluboká nad Vltavou were isolated, Frederick sent eight messengers ordering them to evacuate but the Pandurs caught them all. Frederick desired to bring the Austrian army to battle but Traun's strategy was to avoid battle and let starvation compel the Prussians to retreat. On 22 October, Saxe-Weissenfels' Saxon corps rendezvoused with Prince Charles's army at Radíč (Raditsch) raising its numbers to 69,514 men, 10,000 more than Frederick's Prussian army. (Note: Browning credited the Austro-Saxon army with 75,000 men (Browning, p. 183).)

On 23 October, Colonel Franz von der Trenck and 2,000 Pandurs with 2 guns stormed České Budějovice, capturing 1,000 Prussians and 14 guns. That day, Generalfeldwachtmeister Ernst Dietrich Marschall with 2,400 Austrians and 8 guns accepted the surrender of Tábor with 1,500 Prussians and 2 guns after a siege that began on 20 October. Hluboká nad Vltavou surrendered after its water supply was cut off, making a total of 3,000 Prussians lost at the three places.

On 24 October, Prince Charles brought his army to Maršovice (Marschowitz), southwest of Benešov. Frederick marched to meet the Austro-Saxon force, hoping to save the campaign by defeating his enemies in battle. The Austrians occupied high ground with a muddy stream in front of its right flank and its left flank protected by swampy terrain. The next day, the Prussian generals got a good look and decided their enemies occupied an impregnable position. The historian, Christopher Duffy, noted that "it would have been suicide to attack". The disappointed Prussians marched back to the Camp of Konopischt.

== Campaign's end ==
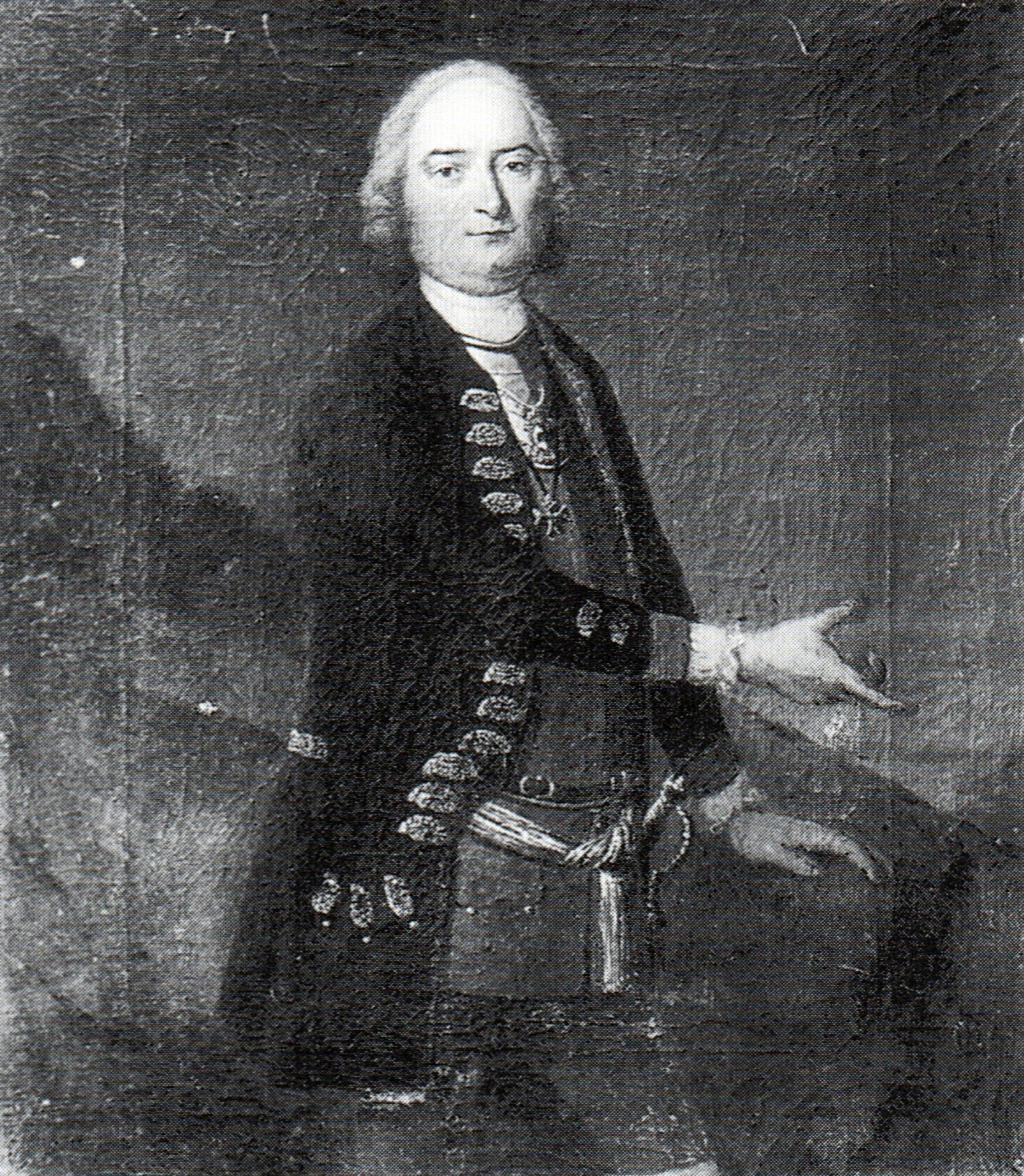
Gottfried von Einsiedel

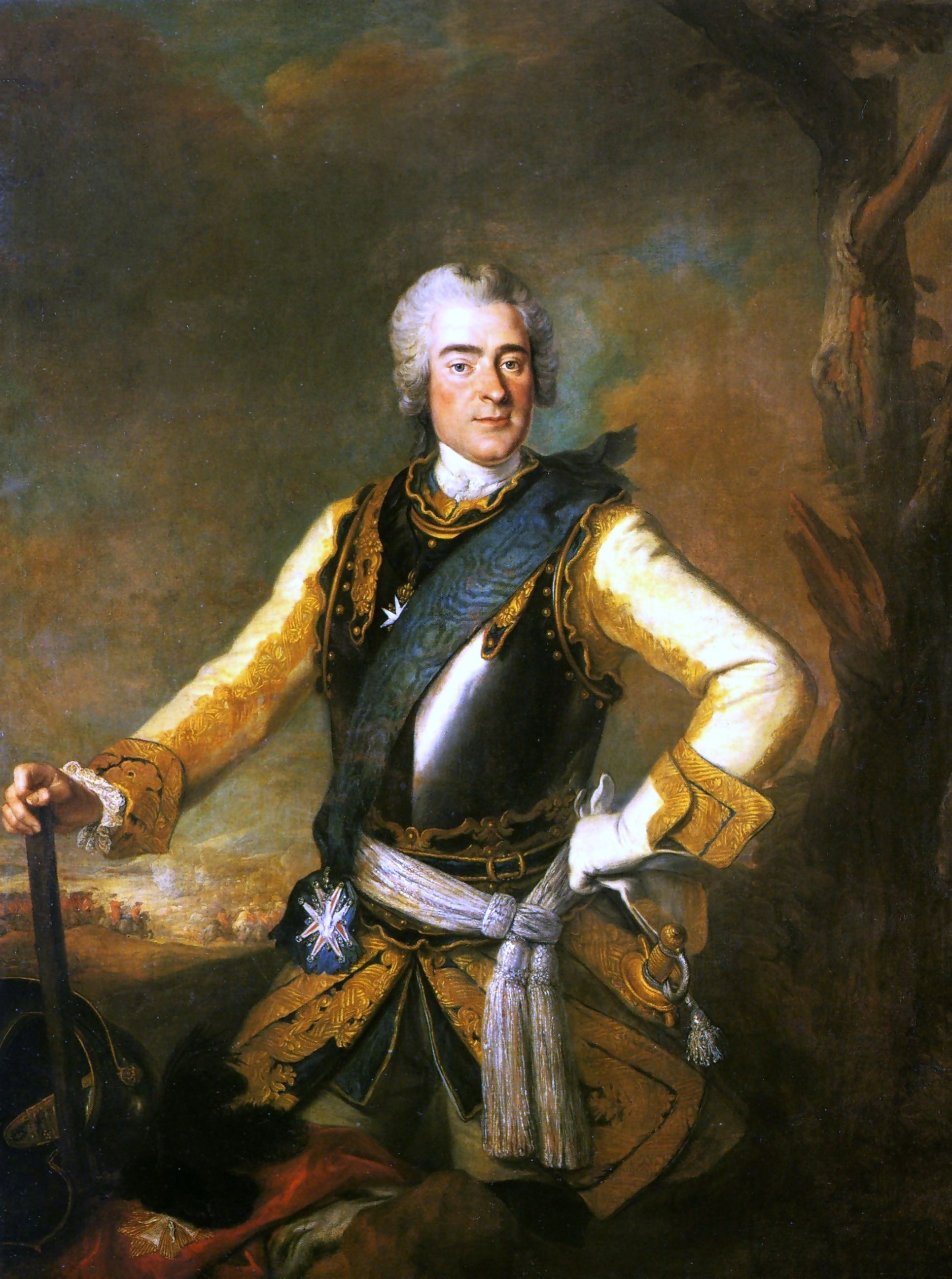
Chevalier de Saxe

On 26 October 1744, the Prussian army abandoned the Camp of Konopischt and crossed to the north bank of the Sázava River, unable to find forage for its horses. Nassau led the advanced guard to Kolín on the Elbe, getting there before it could be seized by an Austrian detachment. At the same time, the Prussian magazine at Pardubice (Pardubitz) repelled an attack by the Pandurs. The team of Prince Charles and Traun maneuvered to threaten Prague to the west and Pardubice to the east. On 1 November, Frederick's army began marching northeast toward Kutná Hora (Kuttenberg) but found, on 5 November, that the Austro-Saxon army had beaten them to it. Frederick was compelled to cross the Elbe at Kolín and abandon the district south of the river. On 9 November, the Prussian army set up its defenses along the Elbe between Kolín and Pardubice. Frederick hoped to be able to set up winter quarters in his current position.

At 2:00 am on 19 November 1744, elements of the Austro-Saxon army crossed the Elbe at Týnec nad Labem (Elbe-Teinitz) and won a bridgehead during the day. With his defenses broken, Frederick determined to retreat in two columns across the mountains to Silesia. The Young Dessauer was ordered to evacuate the Pardubice magazine and lead the eastern column to Kłodzko. Frederick led the western column via Hradec Králové (Königgrätz) and Náchod. Einsiedel was ordered to abandon Prague after spiking his siege guns and blowing up the fortifications. The last part was mismanaged and the walls were hardly damaged. The Pandurs ignored the eastern column, harassed the western column and thoroughly hounded Einsiedel's column. The Austrian light troops swarmed into Prague as the rearguard left the city on 26 November. Einsiedel's column reached the Prussian magazine at Litoměřice and turned east into the mountains. On 9 December, Einsiedel found his column blocked by a Saxon force under General of Cavalry Johann Georg, Chevalier de Saxe. Faced with this, many of his soldiers deserted but Einseidel led his survivors onto side roads. They were saved on 16 December by a rescue column led by Nassau near Frýdlant (Friedland in Böhmen).

Duffy estimated that the Prussians lost between 10,000 and 30,000 men during the campaign. They retreated on roads deep in mud and in cold and wet weather. The number of sick soldiers rose every day and the army was "shattered" by the time that it arrived in Silesia. Browning stated that the Prussian army lost 30,000 soldiers out of 70,000 engaged. On 21 December 1744, Prince Charles' army camped at Prudnik (Neustadt) in Silesia after overrunning the County of Kladsko. Both sides finally went into winter quarters in mid-January 1745 after Leopold I, Prince of Anhalt-Dessau (Old Dessauer) recovered the County of Kladsko for Prussia.

== Commentary ==
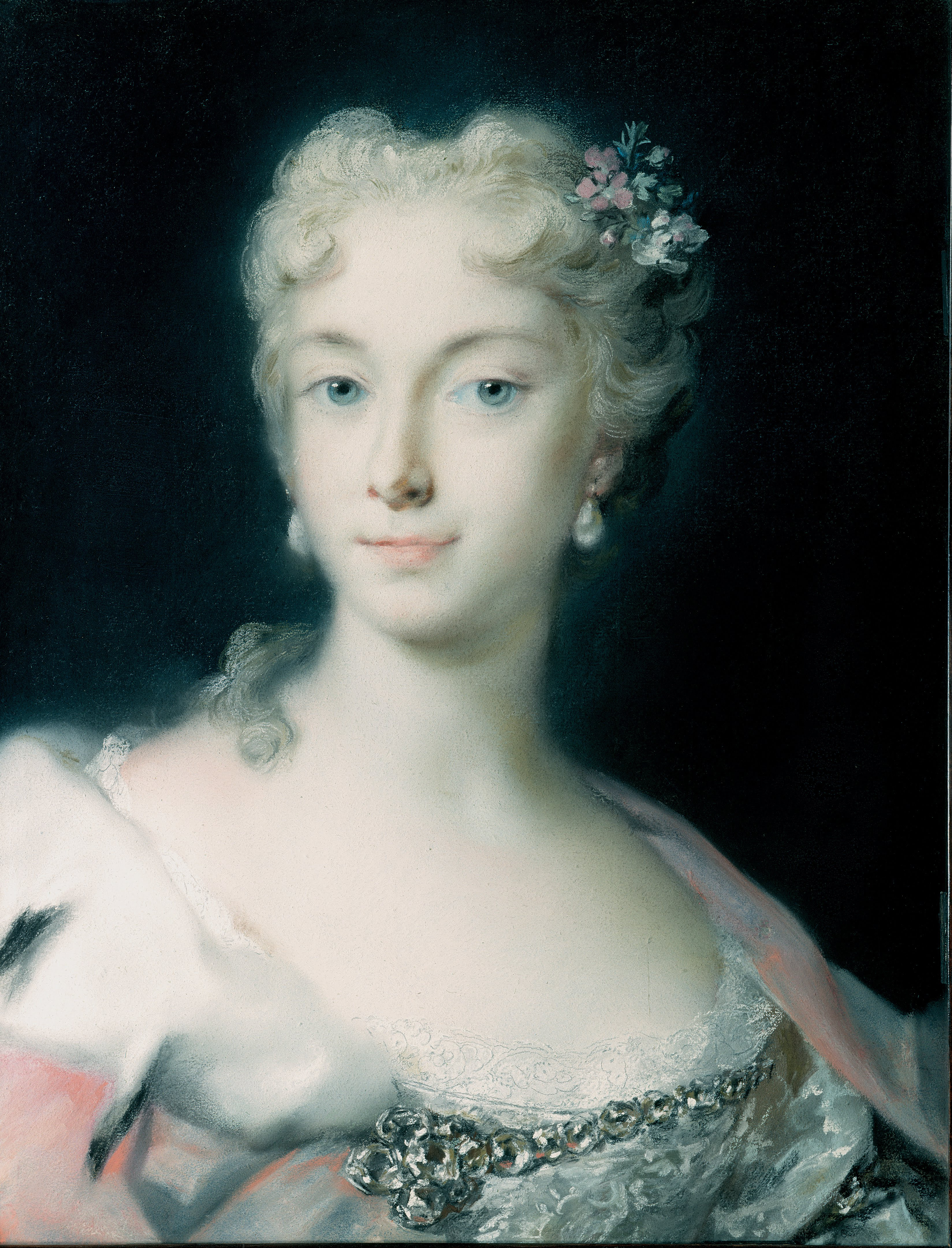
Maria Theresa

The campaign was a Prussian defeat because Frederick made three errors. First, he did not anticipate France's lack of cooperation or Saxony's likely defection. Second, he did not strengthen his logistics in the form of food, clothing, and medicine for his soldiers or fodder for his animals. Third, he overextended the Prussian army by spreading it across eastern Bohemia. Maria Theresa gave both Prince Charles and Traun credit for expelling the Prussians from Bohemia, though Charles later resented having to share the glory with Traun. Years later, Frederick admitted that Traun was his teacher in the art of war. Duffy asserted that, "The spectre of 1744 remained at Frederick's shoulder for the rest of his life."

== Notes ==
Footnotes

Citations
