= Siege of Prague (1744) =

War of the Austrian Succession siege

- Part of War of the Austrian Succession
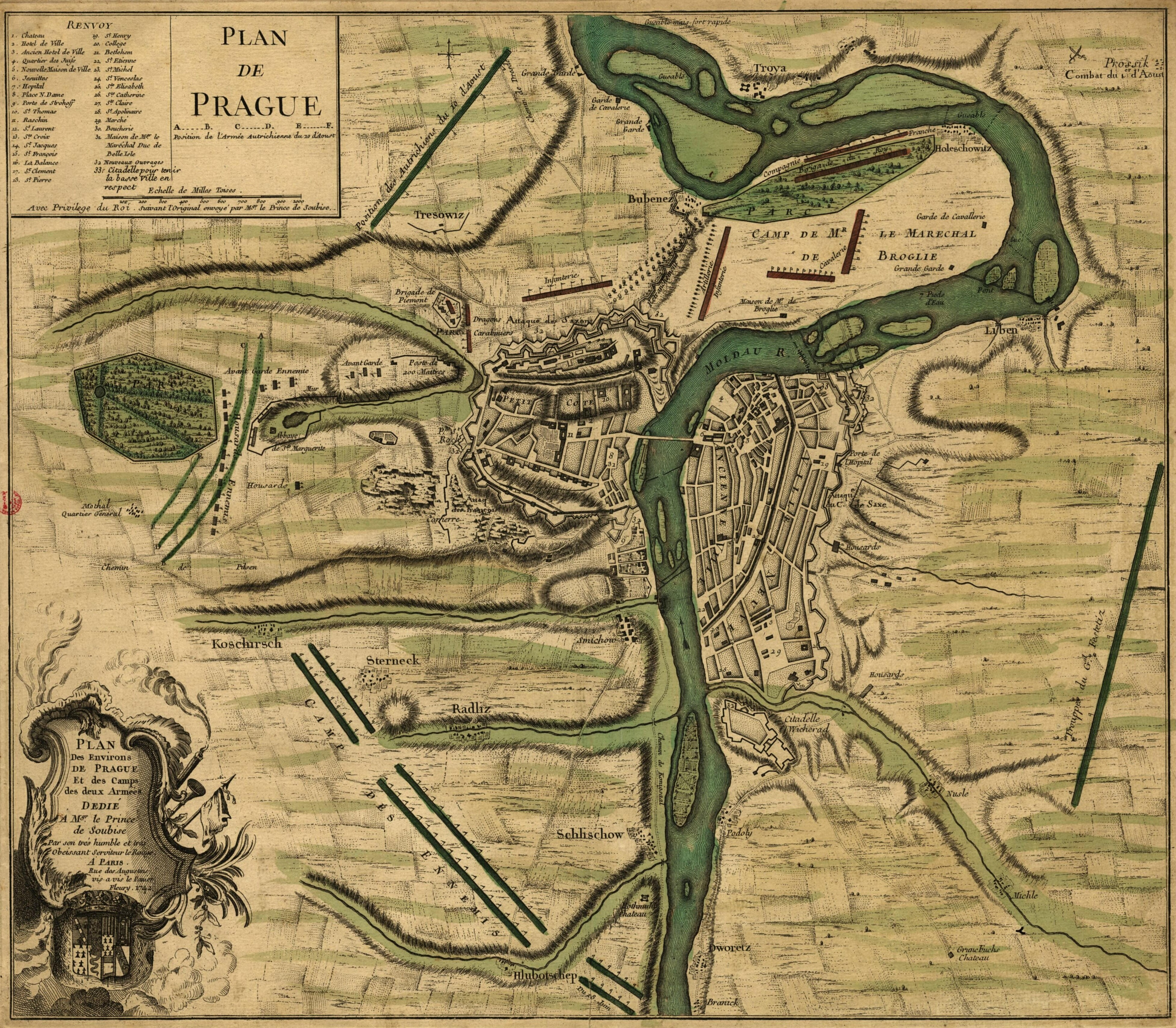
- Map of Prague in 1742 shows the fortifications on both banks of the Vltava (Moldau) River.
Date	6–16 September 1744
Location	Prague, Kingdom of Bohemia (now the Czech Republic)
Result	Prussian victory

Belligerents
Kingdom of Prussia	Habsburg monarchy

Commanders and leaders
Frederick II	Franz Hermann O'Gilvie; Ferdinand Harsch

Strength
71,843–80,000, 182 field guns, 56 siege guns	14,000–17,000, 116 guns, 14 mortars

Casualties and losses
150–160 killed & wounded	1,400 killed & wounded 13,500 POW. 130 guns

The Siege of Prague (6–16 September 1744) resulted in the surrender of the Habsburg Austrian garrison of Prague during the Bohemian campaign of 1744 in the War of the Austrian Succession. The Prussian besiegers were commanded by King Frederick II while the Austrians were led by Franz Karl Hermann von O'Gilvie and Ferdinand Philipp Harsch von Almedingen. In August 1744, the Prussian army under Frederick II suddenly invaded the Habsburg territory of Bohemia. Frederick's army converged on Prague in such strength that Károly József Batthyány's Austrian army was unable to intervene. The Prussian siege artillery quickly reduced the defensive works of Prague and forced the garrison to surrender in mid-September. After this brilliant start, Frederick overextended his army by seizing the eastern half of Bohemia. In October, the Austrian army of Prince Charles Alexander of Lorraine and a Saxon corps joined with Batthyány's forces. By the end of the year, the Austro-Saxon army evicted the Prussians from Bohemia, including Prague.

== Background ==
To end the First Silesian War, part of the War of the Austrian Succession, King Frederick II of Prussia and Queen Maria Theresa of the Habsburg monarchy signed the Treaty of Breslau on 28 July 1742. Austria formally recognized Prussia's seizure of Lower and Upper Silesia and the County of Kladsko (Glatz). Though painful, the treaty allowed Austria a free hand to deal with her other enemies. During the next two years, King Frederick II expanded his army's strength to 94,500 infantry and 29,200 cavalry by adding the following newly-created units: nine regular battalions, seven garrison battalions, twenty hussar squadrons, two foot jäger companies, and one mounted jäger squadron.

In January 1744, Frederick secretly decided to re-enter the war against Austria by enlisting help from the Electorate of Bavaria, Electoral Palatinate, and Landgraviate of Hesse-Kassel. He reopened covert talks with France during which the Treaty of Paris was signed on 5 June 1744. Frederick promised to invade Bohemia with 80,000 troops in August. For its part, France would attack the Austrian Netherlands while defending Alsace. France promised to tie down Austrian forces, preventing them from transferring from the Rhine River to Bohemia. Though she was advised against it, Maria Theresa determined to invade the province of Alsace.

The French Army of Flanders invaded the Austrian Netherlands on 17 May 1744. The French army rapidly forced the surrender of Menen, Ypres, Fort Knokke, and Veurne (Furnes) in June and July. This campaign was paused when Prince Charles Alexander of Lorraine and 60,000 Austrian troops outmaneuvered the local French army and crossed the Rhine into Alsace on 2 July. King Frederick II received news on 12 July that Prince Charles was in Alsace. The French withdrew 32,000 men from Flanders and began marching them to defend Alsace. On 8 August, Prince Charles received the message that Frederick was about to attack and to start sending his army east to fight the Prussians. On 14 August, the Prussian army began crossing the border into Bohemia.

== Invasion ==
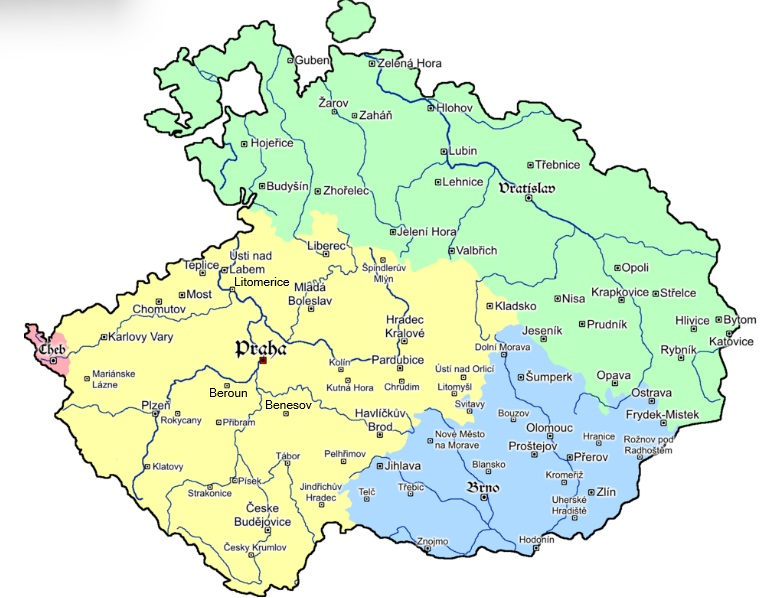
Map shows Bohemia (yellow), Moravia (blue), and Silesia (green).

The Prussian invasion started what is called the Second Silesian War. King Frederick led a 40,000-man column to enter Bohemia from the north. Leopold II, Prince of Anhalt-Dessau (Young Dessauer) led 16,000 Prussians into Bohemia from the northeast while 16,000 soldiers under Kurt Christoph Graf von Schwerin entered Bohemia farther east. The first two columns violated territory belonging to the Electorate of Saxony while the last column started from Kłodzko (Glatz). Frederick's army entered Bohemia by the Elbe valley and marched via Teplice (Toplitz) and Lovosice (Lobositz). Leopold II's column started at Bautzen (Budyšin) and rendezvoused with Frederick's army at Litoměřice (Leitmeritz). Schwerin's column entered Bohemia at Broumov (Braunau), and marched east. A 20,000-man column was placed east of Kłodzko as a threat to Moravia and the fortress of Olomouc (Olmutz). The Moravian column was commanded by Heinrich Karl von der Marwitz.

Reed Browning stated that 80,000 Prussians invaded Bohemia, though his three invading columns total only 72,000. Gaston Bodart asserted that Prague was besieged by 80,000 Prussians. David G. Chandler credited the three main Prussian invading columns with 71,843 men, 182 field artillery pieces, and 56 siege guns. Ultimately, these forces would be opposed by 108,563 Austrians supported by 197 guns. In August 1744, Károly József Batthyány commanded 21,000 Austrians in the Upper Palatinate.

Batthyány marched 12,000 men from this army east into Bohemia and took post at Beroun (Beraun). Frederick's main army was accompanied on the Elbe by 480 boats carrying his heavy artillery and supplies. Schwerin reached Prague on 31 August 1744 and the main Prussian army arrived near Prague a day later. On 5 September, Frederick ordered Hans Christoph Friedrich Graf von Hacke and 6,000 men to Beroun, southwest of Prague. There was a minor action at Beroun in which the Prussians fought their way out with the help of a relief column. The clash also caused Batthyány to base his army farther away at Plzeň (Pilsen).

On 23 August 1744, Prince Charles evacuated his army from Alsace and crossed to the east bank of the Rhine. This move met only slight opposition because King Louis XV was stricken with smallpox, throwing the French war effort into confusion. Frederick was infuriated that the French had allowed the Austrian army to escape so easily. This event convinced Frederick to seize as much of Bohemia as possible before Prince Charles' army could arrive.

== Siege ==
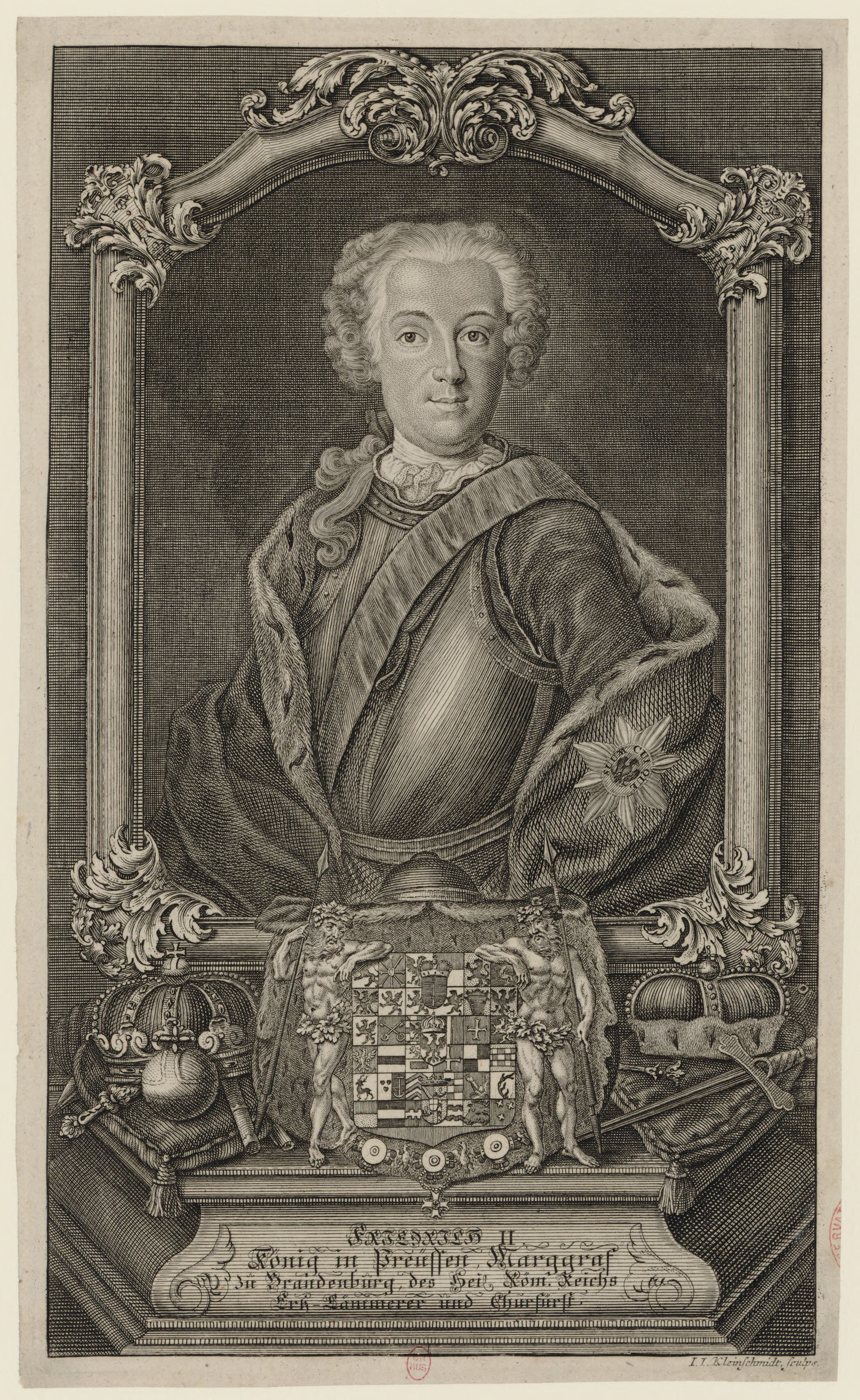
King Frederick II, 1740

On 6 September 1744, King Frederick II's army formally began the siege of Prague. According to Bodart, there were 80,000 Prussians and 14,900 Austrian defenders, including 4,400 regulars and 10,500 militia. The garrison was commanded by Feldzeugmeister Franz Karl Hermann von O'Gilvie who was also governor during the 1741 loss of Prague and would rise to the rank of Field Marshal in 1745. Generalfeldwachtmeister Ferdinand Philipp Harsch von Almedingen led the Austrian regulars. Harsch would be promoted to Feldzeugmeister in 1754. Thomas Carlyle stated that the Prague garrison counted 4,000 regulars and 10,000 militia. Reed Browning asserted that the Prague garrison numbered 17,000.

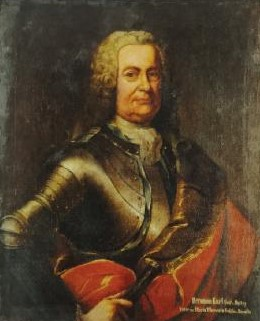
Hermann von O'Gilvie

After a delay caused by the capture of an Austrian fort at Děčín (Tetschen), the flotilla bringing the siege artillery arrived on 8 September 1744. By the evening of 9 September, the heavy guns were emplaced and began battering Prague's walls from three sides. The siege guns were sited near Bubeneč (Bubenez) on the north side, the Weissenberg (White Hill) on the west side, and the Ziskaberg on the east side. The guns mounted on Prague's walls were not very effective because they were on low ground. However, the guns of the Austrian redoubt on the Ziskaberg were so annoying that the Prussians decided to capture the position. On 12 September, Schwerin's corps successfully stormed the Ziskaberg redoubt. That day, Margrave Friedrich Wilhelm of Brandenburg-Schwedt, a cousin of Frederick was killed when he was beheaded by a cannonball.

The Prussian siege guns near Bubeneč wrecked the water mill and the sluice gates so that the Vltava became wadable. The heavy guns caused so much damage that on 15 September Harsch proposed that the garrison should go free in exchange for surrendering the city. Frederick refused this, so Harsch capitulated on 16 September 1744. According to Christopher Duffy, the Prussians lost 50 dead and 110 wounded. Bodart stated that the Prussians lost 150 killed and wounded, including 6 officers. The Austrians suffered 1,400 men killed and wounded, including 9 officers, during the siege, while 116 guns, 14 mortars, and 13,500 men (including 3,700 regulars) were captured of whom 216 were officers. The prisoners were marched to Kłodzko and other Prussian fortresses. Immediately, the Prussians began to impress some of the city's residents into their army and demanded that Prague authorities pay a ransom of 200,000 pounds sterling.

== Aftermath ==
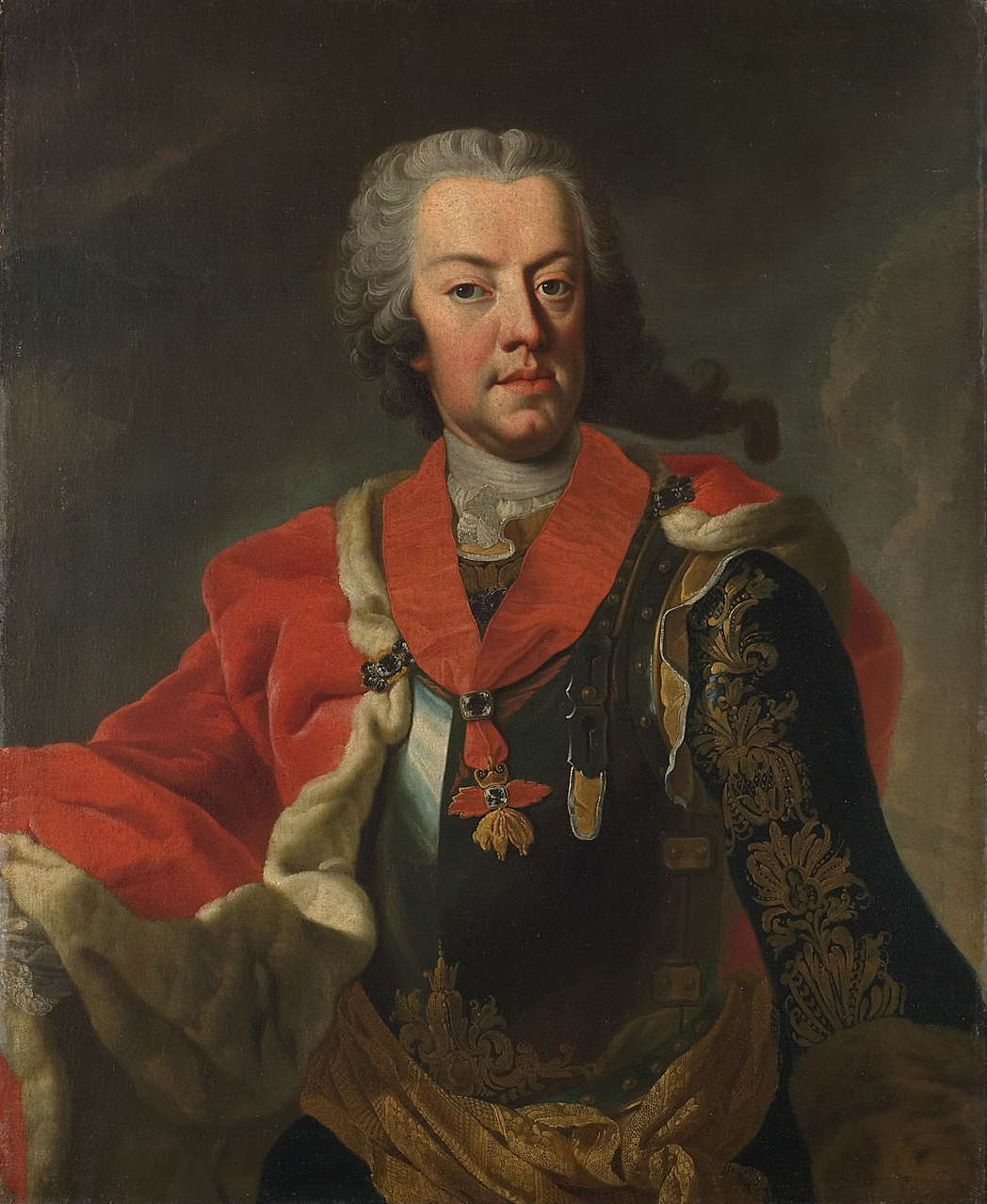
Charles of Lorraine

Showing complete confidence in his army, Frederick decided to seize the entire eastern half of Bohemia. As early as 17 September 1744, the Prussian army began to march south while Gottfried Emanuel von Einsiedel and 5,000 troops garrisoned Prague. On 27 September, the Prussian army occupied Tábor, harassed by the Austrian Pandurs from Batthyány's army. On 2 October the Prussian advance guard reached Hluboka nad Vltavou (Frauenberg). Led by Ernst Christoph von Nassau, the advance guard captured České Budějovice (Budweis).

Several events occurred to help Austria's cause. The Saxons, previously allied with Prussia, switched sides and sent Austria a corps of 20,000 troops. On 11 August 1744, the Kingdom of Great Britain paid 150,000 pounds sterling to Austria to recruit 20,000 more soldiers. Maria Theresa got the Kingdom of Hungary to promise 25,000 more soldiers. Prince Charles marched his army across southern Germany with surprising speed. On 26 September, Prince Charles reached Waldmünchen on the Bohemian border. On 2 October, the armies of Prince Charles and Batthyány joined and the combined force numbered 55,000 men. When the Saxons joined on 22 October, Prince Charles commanded 75,000 troops.

The subsequent Bohemian campaign of 1744 was a history of Prussian disaster. The Austrian Pandurs and hussars hounded the overextended Prussian army without mercy. Frederick tried to fight the opposing army but was unable to locate it. When he was finally able to confront Prince Charles' army near Benešov (Beneschau), he declined to attack because the Austro-Saxon position was impregnable. By late November 1744, Einsiedel abandoned Prague and the Prussians were in full retreat from Bohemia. The numbers of deserters and sick soldiers rapidly increased and the Prussian army returned to Silesia in a state of collapse.
