= Karl Gottlieb Guichard =

European soldier and military writer (1724–1775)

Karl Guichard
- Born: 1724; Magdeburg, Prussia
- Died: 1775 (aged 50–51) Potsdam, Prussia
- Allegiance: Prussia
- Service years: 1761–1773

Karl Gottlieb Guichard (1724 – 1775) also known as Quintus Icilius, was a soldier and military writer.

== Life ==
He was born in Magdeburg, Prussia, to a family of French refugees.

He was educated for the Church, and in Leiden actually preached a sermon as a candidate for the pastorate. But he abandoned theology for more secular studies, especially that of ancient history, in which his learning attracted the notice of the Prince of Orange, who promised him a vacant professorship at Utrecht. On his arrival, however, he found that another scholar had been elected by the local authorities, and he thereupon sought and obtained a commission in the Dutch army.

He made the campaigns of 1747-1748 in the Low Countries. In the peace which followed, his combined military and classical training turned his thoughts in the direction of ancient military history. His notes on this subject grew into a treatise, and in 1754 he went over to England in order to consult various libraries.

In 1757, his Mémoires militaires sur les Grecs et les Romains appeared at the Hague, and when Carlyle wrote his Frederick the Great it had reached its fifth edition. Coming back, with English introductions, to the Continent, he sought service with Ferdinand of Brunswick, who sent him on to Frederick the Great, whom he joined in January 1758 at Breslau. The king was very favourably impressed with Guichard and his works, and he remained for nearly 18 months in the royal suite.

His Prussian official name of Quintus Icilius was the outcome of a friendly dispute with the king (see Nikolai, Anekdoten, vi. 129-145; Carlyle, Frederick the Great, viii. 113-114). Frederick in discussing the battle of Pharsalia spoke of a centurion Quintus Caecilius as Q. Icilius. Guichard ventured to correct him, whereupon the king said, "You shall be Quintus Icilius," and as Major Quintus Icilius he was forthwith gazetted to the command of a free battalion.

This corps he commanded throughout the later stages of the Seven Years' War, his battalion, as time went on, becoming a regiment of three battalions, and Quintus himself recruited seven more battalions of the same kind of troops. His command was almost always with the king's own army in these campaigns, but for a short time it fought in the western theatre under Prince Henry. When not on the march he was always at the royal headquarters, and it was he who brought about the famous interview between the king and Gellert (see Carlyle, Frederick the Great, ix. log; Gellert, Briefwechsel mit Demoiselle Lucius, ed. Ebert, Leipzig, 1823, pp. 629–631) on the subject of national German literature.

On January 22, 1761, Quintus was ordered to sack the castle of Hubertusburg (a task which Major-General Saldern had point-blank refused to undertake, from motives of conscience), and carried out his task, it is said, to his own very considerable profit. The place cannot have been seriously injured, as it was soon afterwards the meeting-place of the diplomats whose work ended in the Treaty of Hubertusburg, but the king never ceased to banter Quintus on his supposed depredations.

The very day of Frederick's triumphant return from the war saw the disbanding of most of the free battalions, including that of Quintus, but the major to the end of his life remained with the king. He was made lieutenant-colonel in 1765, and in 1773, in recognition of his work Mémoires critiques et historiques sur plusieurs points d'antiquités militaires, dealing mainly with Julius Caesar's campaigns in Spain (Berlin, 1773), was promoted colonel. He died in Potsdam in 1775.
