= Wolf Frederick von Retzow =

Wolf Frederick von Retzow, Prussian Lieutenant General during the Seven Years' War, was born in 1699 on the Estate Möthlow near Nauen in the Märkisch Luch. He died of dysentery on 5 November 1758 in Schweidnitz.

== Military and administrative career ==
The son of an aristocratic family, Retzow was educated at the cavalry academy in Brandenburg. He entered the regiment "von Schlabrendorff" at the age of 17 as a cadet. In 1745 he became commander-in-chief of the battalion Grenadier-Garde, which was stationed in Potsdam. Two years later, he became the head of the authority providing food and provisions for the army, as well as some important state-owned enterprises, such as the Great Military House and the Gold and Silver Manufactory in Berlin. When Frederick II called for the construction of a Bohemian weaver colony near Potsdam in the spring of 1751, he commissioned Retzow with its establishment.

The new colony was built in the immediate vicinity of Neuendorf. Retzow remained closely connected with his colony until his death. He was not only their first commander but also the first distributor of the textiles they produced. When, from 1756 onward, other distributors took up the work, Colonel Retzow was judge and intermediary between the weavers and the new manufacturers.

Because of his special merit in the Battle of Leuthen during the Seven Years' War, Retzow was still appointed Lieutenant-General on the battlefield by Frederick the Great. Prior to the Battle of Hochkirch, Frederick dispatched an entire Prussian corps to the hills east of Hochkirch in late September; by early October, Retzow's corps was within 2 kilometers (1 mi) of the Austrians; Frederick ordered Retzow to take the hill that commanded the area, called Strohmberg. When Retzow arrived there, he discovered that the Austrians already had laid possession with a strong force. He refused the order to storm the position. Disgraced, Retzow surrendered his sword; Frederick also had him arrested. Retzow was already suffering from dysentery and was transferred to Schweidnitz, where he died.

Retzow was married to Charlotte Louise von Röseler (born 1706; died 7 May 1779), daughter of General Friedrich August von Röseler. The couple had several children:

- Friedrich August (13 July 1729 – 18 October 1812)
- Wilhelm Leopold (13 July 1729 – 14 May 1803) married Henriette von Thiele

- Charlotte (1767–1833) wife of the Field Marshal Friedrich von Kleist

- Marie Charlotte (25 September 1781) married Peter Christian von Kleist (9 November 1727 – 21 November 1777)

- Hans Jürgen von Kleist-Retzow

- Friederike Albertine married Adam August von Möllendorf.

== Citations ==
=== Literature ===
- Kurt von Priesdorff: Soldatisches Führertum. Band 1, Hanseatische Verlagsanstalt Hamburg, ohne Jahr, S. 400–401.
- Neuendorf-Nowawes-Babelsberg; Stationen eines Stadtteils; Autorenkollektiv; Herausgeber: Förderkreis Böhmisches Dorf Nowawes und Neuendorf e. V.; Geiger-Verlag, Horb am Neckar; 2000
- Bernhard von Poten, Retzow, Wolf Friedrich von, ADB, vol. 28, pp 277–278.

Military offices
| Preceded by Gottfried Emanuel von Einsiedel | Chef of Infantry Regiment Nr. 6; 1745–1759 | Succeeded by Friedrich Christoph von Saldern |
