= Caspar Otto von Glasenapp =

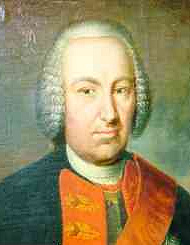
- Born: 25 June 1664; Neustettin
- Died: 7 August 1747 (aged 83); Berlin
- Relatives: Erdmann von Glasenapp (brother)
- Military career
- Allegiance: (Kingdom of Prussia) Prussia 1679–1747
- Branch: Army
- Rank: Prussian field marshal
- Awards: Order of Saint John; Black Eagle Order; De la Générosité

Caspar Otto von Glasenapp (25 June 1664 at Gut Wurchow, Neustettin district–7 August 1747 in Berlin) was a Prussian officer, most recently Generalfeldmarschall.

== Family ==
Glasenapp came from the well-known Pomeranian nobility of Glasenapp. His parents were Kaspar Otto von Glasenapp (died 5 January 1664 in Kolberg) and his wife Ernestina von Zitzewitz. He married Anna Margarete von Zastrow from the house Beerwalde on 14 February 1700 in Koslin. The marriage was childless. His brothers were Paul Casimir, Heinrich Christoph, Paul Wedig, and Generalmajor Erdmann von Glasenapp.

== Military career ==
After entering the Kurfürsten Leibregiment (No. 1) as a fähnrich in 1679, he was promoted in 1687 to second lieutenant. On 9 September 1692, Glasenapp was appointed chief of staff, on 15 July 1695, to the captain and company commander of the Regiment (now called the "Fusilier-Garde").

During the War of Spanish Succession, Glasenapp took part in the fighting in Hungary, on the Rhine and in the Brabant. Glasenapp was promoted to major on 10 November 1705, on 6 December 1709 to the lieutenant colonel. On 11 May 1713 he became colonel and regimental commander, to the colonel and commander of the regiment, called Regiment Wartensleben zu Fuss. On 17 October 1723 he became Generalmajor and Proprietor (Inhaber) (chief) of his regiment, the 1st Prussian Infantry Regiment.

On 10 February 1729, Glasenapp was appointed Commander of Berlin. He continued to implement the detailed arrangements of King Frederick William I for the purpose of curbing beggary and cleanliness in the streets of Berlin. His efforts to enforce order and discipline were respected in the city. On 12 May 1732 he became a lieutenant general, on 1 December 1735 governor of Berlin, but he remained at the same time a regimental clerk. Glasenapp became a Prelate of the Hohenstift of Cammin in Pomerania on 1 January 1737, general of the infantry on 29 June 1740. The appointment to the Generalfeldmarschall followed by a patent from 4 June 1741. On 21 July 1742 Glasenapp was exempted from the active military service, but he remained Governor of Berlin and retained the "Honneurs in the army as general field marshal for life."

Glasenapp was buried in the Berlin garrison church in 1747.
