= Friedrich Christoph von Saldern =

Prussian general and military writer

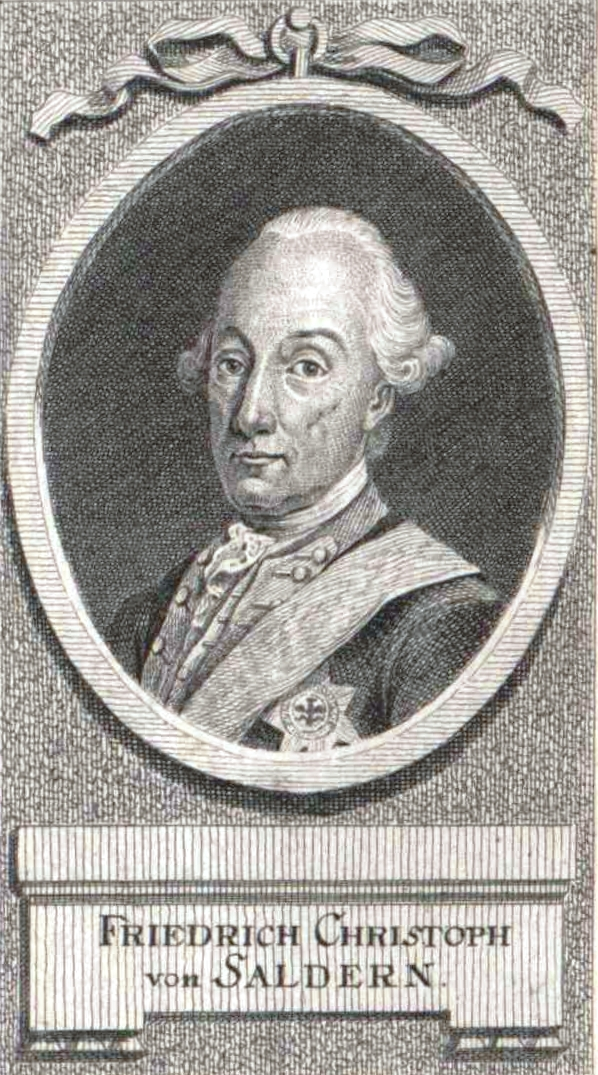
- General and Tactician
- Born: 2 January 1719; Prignitz
- Died: 14 March 1785 (aged 66)
- Military career
- Allegiance: (Kingdom of Prussia) Prussia
- Branch: Army Artillery
- Service years: 1735–1763
- Rank: Lieutenant General
- Conflicts: Second Silesian War; Seven Years' War
- Awards: Pour le Mérite; Order of the Black Eagle; Equestrian statue of Frederick the Great 1851
- Other work: Taktik der Infanterie (Dresden, 1784); Taktische Grundsatze (Dresden, 1786)

Friedrich Christoph von Saldern (2 January 1719 – 14 March 1785) was a Prussian general and military writer. He proved his organizational mettle with the battlefield clean up after Liegnitz in 1760. At the Battle of Torgau he proved his tactical and command mettle in the assault Austrian lines, which changed the course of the battle. His refusal to sack Hubertusburg in 1763 led to his resignation from the army. Despite retirement from command, however, Frederick the Great promoted him to lieutenant general and made him inspector of troops. Saldern wrote at least two missives on infantry tactics. He received the Order Pour le Mérite and the Order of the Black Eagle; in 1851, his name was included on the Equestrian statue of Frederick the Great.

== Family ==
Saldern was born in the Prignitz into a family of the old Lower Saxon nobility Friedrich Christoph Saldern comes from the old Lower Saxon noble family of Saldern. At his birth in 1719 his father Otto Ludolph von Saldern (26 June 1686 – 5 April 1753) was battalion commander of Kolberg; his mother was Lucrezia Tugendreich von Holtzendorf (1700–1728). After her death his father married Sophie Wilhemine von Sack (1709–1780), the daughter of the commander of Kolberg, Siegmund von Sack.

Saldern married three times, first on 1 June 1748 to Sophie Antoinette Katharina von Tettau (1720–1759), a lady in waiting for Queen Elizabeth Christine and daughter of Lieutenant Colonel Carl von Tettau, second, to Wilhelmine von Borcke (6 April 1742, Kassel – 15 May 1766, Potsdam, at age 24) on 5 January 1763; after her death, third, he married in 1767 her sister, Helene Bernhardine von Borcke (1743–1831, Berlin). He had two children who predeceased him.

== Military career ==
He entered the Prussian Army in 1735 in Stettin. Due to his height, he was transferred to the Guards in 1739. When this regiment was dissolved after Frederick II ascension, he was transferred to the second battalion of the new guard regiment as a first lieutenant.

Frederick William died in May 1740 and his son, Frederick II declined to endorse the Pragmatic Sanction. This opened the way for rapid promotions. By the end of 1740, with the death of Charles VI, Holy Roman Emperor, Prussia and Austria were at war over Maria Theresa's succession. With the outbreak of war with Austria, he remained with the king as an aide-de-camp, and he was the first to discover the approach of Neipperg's Austrians preliminary to the Battle of Mollwitz.

He commanded a guard battalion at the Battle of Leuthen, again distinguished himself at the Battle of Hochkirch and was promoted major-general. In 1760 at Liegnitz Frederick gave him four hours in which to collect, arrange and dispatch the spoils of the battle, 6000 prisoners, 100 wagons, 82 guns and 5000 muskets. His complete success marked him as efficient, even in Frederick's army. At the Battle of Torgau, Saldern and von Möllendorf converted a lost battle into a great victory by their desperate assault on the Siptitz Heights with skillful manoeuvring and iron resolution. After Torgau, Saldern was acclaimed as one of the "completest general of infantry alive" by Thomas Carlyle. Subsequently, Frederick claimed that Saldern had brains and heart, by which he meant courage.

In the following winter, however, being ordered by Frederick to sack Hubertusburg, Saldern refused on the ground of conscience. The king pressed him, saying that he himself could take the contents of the palace for himself. The king continued to push him, and Saldern refused. The king finally dismissed him, saying, "He will not be rich," and gave up the task to Colonel Quintus-Icilius. Saldern retired, but Frederick was well aware that he needed Saldern's experience and organizing ability, and after the peace the general was at once made inspector of the troops at Magdeburg. In 1766 he became lieutenant-general.

Saldern spent the remainder of his life studying military sciences, in which he became a pedant. In one of his works he discussed at great length the question of the proper cadence for the infantry: was it 75 paces per minute, or 76? The "Saldern-tactics" proliferated in the Prussian military following Frederick's death, and contributed powerfully to the disaster of Jena in 1806. His works included Taktik der Infanterie (Dresden, 1784) and Taktische Grundsatze (Dresden, 1786), and were the basis of the British "Dundas" drill-book.

Saldern received the Order Pour le Mérite and the Order of the Black Eagle; in 1851, his name was included on the Equestrian statue of Frederick the Great.

== See also ==
- House of Saldern

== Sources ==
- Bernhard von Poten (1890). "Saldern, Christoph von" . Allgemeine Deutsche Biographie (in German). Vol. 30. Leipzig: Duncker & Humblot. pp. 211–213.
- Hennings, Peter. Familienstammbaum, Friedrich Christoph von Saldern
- König, Anton Balthasar, Friedrich Christoph von Saldern, Biographisches Lexikon aller Helden und Militairpersonen, Band III, Arnold Wever, Berlin, 1790.
- Luvaas, Jay. (1966) Frederick the Great on the Art of War. New York: Free Press. ISBN 978-1-11178-540-6
- Preußische Allgemeine Zeitung: Folge 10 vom 13. März 2010 Er wählte Ungnade, wo Gehorsam nicht Ehre brachte;

Military offices
Preceded by Wolf Frederick von Retzow	Chef of Infantry Regiment Nr. 6; 1759–1766	Succeeded by Hans Sigismund von Lestwitz
