= Heino Heinrich Graf von Flemming =

Saxon-Brandenburger army leader, field marshal and Governor of Berlin

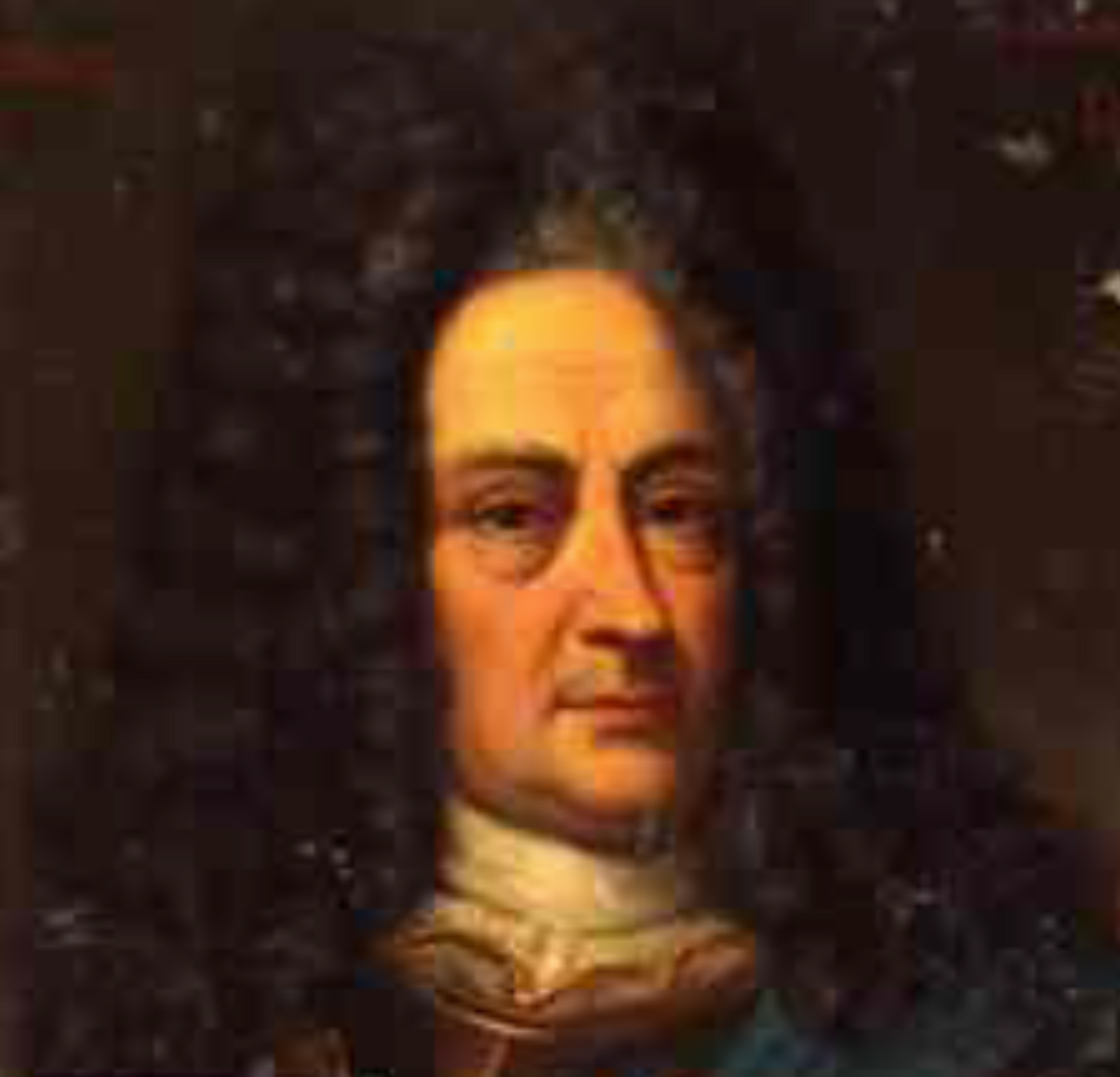
Heino Heinrich Graf von Flemming

Heino Heinrich Reichsgraf von Flemming (8 May 1632 – 1 March 1706) was a Saxon, later Brandenburger army leader and field marshal and Governor of Berlin.

Flemming was born in Martenthin into an old noble Brandenburg family that probably emigrated from the Netherlands. He was the third-born son of Jakob von Flemming and Barbara von Pfuel. After a comprehensive education at German universities, Flemming fought the Ottoman Turks as a colonel of auxiliary troops in the service of Brandenburg. Frederick William, Elector of Brandenburg, sent him to the King of Poland in 1672. After serving William of Orange excellently several times, Flemming eventually came to serve in the Brandenburg army, although in times of peace he served in other armies. Because of his ability and bravery he received many offers to change services, and in 1682 became a Feldmarschallleutnant (roughly the equivalent of a two-star general) in the Saxon army. Commanding the Saxon auxiliary troops, he contributed to the delaying of the Turks before Vienna in 1683.

On 15 February 1684 he became commander of Saxon troops and became a field marshal after the death of Baron von der Goltz on 8 September 1688.

In this and the following year he commanded the Saxon troops on the Rhine under Elector John George III. However, he was suspended for multiple personal offenses, which hurt him deeply. The Austrian generals accused him of corruption. He left the Saxon army and became a marshal with the Brandenburg army, one of four field marshals who did so (the other three being John George II, Prince of Anhalt-Dessau, Derfflinger, and Spaen). Flemming commanded successfully in Flanders and retired in 1698 for health reasons.

In 1691, he was made regimental chef of the 1st Prussian Infantry Regiment, a position which he held until 1698.

In 1667, he married Agnes Dorothea von Schwerin, niece of Otto von Schwerin, President of the Elector of Brandenburg's Privy Council. 1674 he married Dorothea Elisabeth von Pfuel († 1740), daughter of Georg Adam von Pfuel (1618–1672), royal Prussian General of the Cavalry, Governor of Spandau Citadel, Lord of Groß- und Klein-Buckow (Märkische Schweiz). They had four sons and two daughters.
