= Ernst Christoph von Nassau =

Prussian general lieutenant and knight of the Black Eagle Order

Ernst Christopher von Nassau
- Born: 1686; Hartmannsdorf (Jaczków) near Glogau
- Died: 19 November 1755 (aged 68–69); Bautzen
- Military career
- Allegiance: Prussia c. 1702–1710; Hesse c. 1710–? Saxony 1738. Prussia
- Branch: Prussian Army
- Service years: Prussia: 1740–1746
- Rank: Lieutenant General
- Conflicts: War of the Spanish Succession; First Silesian War; Second Silesian War; Seven Years' War
- Awards: Black Eagle Order; Equestrian statue of Frederick the Great

Ernst Christoph von Nassau, sometimes called Christoph Ernst, (1686 in Hartmannsdorf (Jaczków) near Glogau–19 November 1755 in Sagan) was a Prussian general lieutenant and knight of the Black Eagle Order. He is memorialized on the Equestrian statue of Frederick the Great. After fighting in the Prussian army during the War of Spanish Succession, he transferred to the Hessian army; subsequently, he served during peacetime in the army of the Duke of Saxony and in 1740, upon the ascension of Frederick in 1740, he rejoined the Prussian army and served in the War of Austrian Succession.

== Family ==
Ernst Christoph von Nassau descended from a Silesian family in Hartmannsdorf near Glogau. The property was purchased in 1600 by his grandfather, Ernst von Nassau. Ernst Christoph's son, Christoph Erdmann (1722–1752), was already a cornet with him in Saxon service and died as his father's general adjutant and a Prussian captain. With him, the male line expired.

After the death of his wife, Ernst Christoph lived with the widow of an officer of his regiment, Maria Elisabeth Biebisch, with whom he had three children: Anna Francisca Caroline, Georg Ernst Christoph (born 1747) and Friedrich Joseph Alexander (born 1748/49). The sons were legitimized by patent of 5 February 1787 (and raised to the nobility), by which time the daughter had already died. The patent came into effect only in 1804.

== Military service ==
After his studies, Nassau voluntarily went to the Prussian army. He fought with it in Flanders and Brabant during the War of the Spanish Succession. He then switched to Hessian service, but had to leave it because he fought a duel.

=== Saxon service ===
Nassau subsequently entered the Saxon army. The Elector of Saxony was also the King of Poland. Nassau became a major and appointed to command of the independent company in the regiment of Count Erdmann II, Count of Promnitz, one of August's supporters. Soon Nassau's talents were recognized and he became lieutenant colonel of the cavalry and general and governor-general of Dresden, where he was assigned to Count and Field Marshal August Christoph Graf von Wackerbarth (1662–1734). The Count soon made Nassau his general adjutant and promoted him to the colonel of the cavalry. In addition, Nassau was permitted to establish his own Cuirassier regiment and to recruit from all the cuirassier and dragoon regiments.

In the formation of the regiment, only Holsteiner horses were used and all soldiers were equipped with brightly polished cuirasses. The regiment fought in the campaign of the Rhine and during the War of the Polish Succession. After the death of August II in 1738, Nassau and the ministers Brühl and Sułkowski disputed the future of the Saxon army. He applied for his dismissal and received it.

=== Prussian service ===
Not knowing where to offer his services next, Nassau approached the Prussian King Frederick the Great. Frederick appointed Nassau as major general, and instructed him to recruit a dragoon regiment (Dragoon Regiment No. XI) of Prussian and Saxon officers. He also received ten talers for every man he recruited. Nassau had been successful in Saxony and maintained his contacts: in three months he had a battalion with five squadrons and a second battalion was under formation. Although no horses were available, the regiment was ordered into the camp near Strehlen, where it came under the command of Kurt Christoph Graf von Schwerin. In the First Silesian War the regiment fought in Silesia, Bohemia and Moravia. He was involved in the seven-week Siege of Olomouc.

During Second Silesian War, his regiment was in the vanguard of the army of Prince Prince Moritz of Anhalt-Dessau. In late 1744, upon his promotion to lieutenant general, he received a corps of 8,000 to 10,000 men, with whom he was to secure the Silesian countryside and occupy the fortifications. At the Battle of Hohenfriedberg (4 June 1745), he commanded the left wing and was able to contribute to victory. He conquered the fortress of Cosel and captured the garrison of 3,000 men. He also occupied a line of towns in Silesia: Patschkau, Neustadt, Klein Glogau, Löbschütz, Jägerndorf, Troppau and Oderberg. He defeated the dragoon Regiment of Saxe-Gotha and captured three standards, as well as the Philibert Regiment, which lost a standard. On 21 September 1745 he occupied Tábor and on three days later, 24 September 1745, he occupied Budweis. On 1 October 1745 his force occupied Frauenberg.

Soon he was back in Wodnian with the main army. After the Prussians had to withdraw from Prague under the General Gottfried Emanuel von Einsiedel, Nassau was to occupy Kolín first and thus secure the supply chain for the main army and, later, join Frederick at Marklissa, near Breslau. Effectively cut off from Frederick's army by Austrian troops, Nassau passed through the hostile lines from Kolin to Koeniggratz (24 November), where the King was trapped with his army. Frederick was delighted to see him. For this Nassau became a Knight of the Black Eagle Order. He remained in the winter quarters in Frankenstein until the end of the war.

On 5 March 1746, he was elevated to the rank of a Prussian count and he received a golden tabloid from Frederick with a personal acknowledgement. He died on 19 November 1755 in Sagan. For his work, his name was immortalized in 1851 on one of the honorary plates on the Equestrian statue of Frederick the Great.

He maintained a diary of his experience during the Second Silisian War, which was published as Beitrag zur Geschichte des zweiten Schlesischen Krieges in 1780.
