= Hans Christoph Friedrich Graf von Hacke =

Prussian General and Commandant of Berlin (1699-1754)

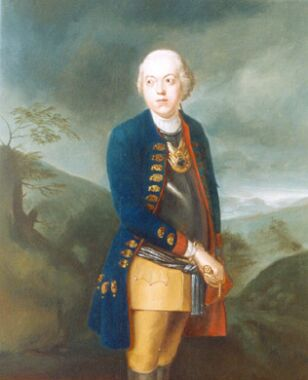
A portrait of Hans Christoph Friedrich Graf von Hacke

Hans Christoph Friedrich Graf von Hacke (21 October 1699 in Staßfurt - 17 August 1754 in Berlin) was a Prussian General and Commandant of Berlin. The Hackescher Markt in Berlin is named after him.

== Early life ==
In 1715, at the age of sixteen, Hacke went to join the army of the Soldier King, Frederick William I of Prussia, and at 1.91 meters tall was assigned the 6th Royal Regiment, the Potsdam Giants. He attracted attention through his particular attentiveness and adherence to orders, which would earn him a great career. At eighteen, he was an ensign, at twenty a lieutenant, twenty-six a first lieutenant, twenty-nine a staff captain, and thirty-two a Hofjägermeister.

== Career ==
His services were greatly appreciated by the King, who permitted him in 1722 to have an oil portrait painted with his hand on his sword. In 1740, he was appointed Royal Adjutant General, making him one of the most significant figures in the King's circle and one of the most influential officers. The royal courts of Berlin, Potsdam and Wusterhausen were under his control, and he also had wide-ranging control in personnel decisions. On 28 July 1740, he was raised to the hereditary title of Graf (equivalent to a continental count or British earl).

After the King's death, Hacke was commander of the military police who protected the new King, Frederick II. He was also present in both Silesian Wars, the capture of Prague and the King's campaigns in Saxony and Bohemia. In 1742 he was appointed as regimental chef of the 1st Prussian Infantry Regiment, a post he held until his death in 1754. In 1745, he was responsible for the defence of Berlin against the threat of siege by Austrian and Saxon forces.

In 1747, Hacke was promoted to the rank of lieutenant general and given oversight of the royal buildings of Berlin. On 10 November 1749, Frederick II named Hacke the Stadtkommandant of Berlin, giving him the added responsibilities of personnel decisions, public policy, the timber trade and press censorship.

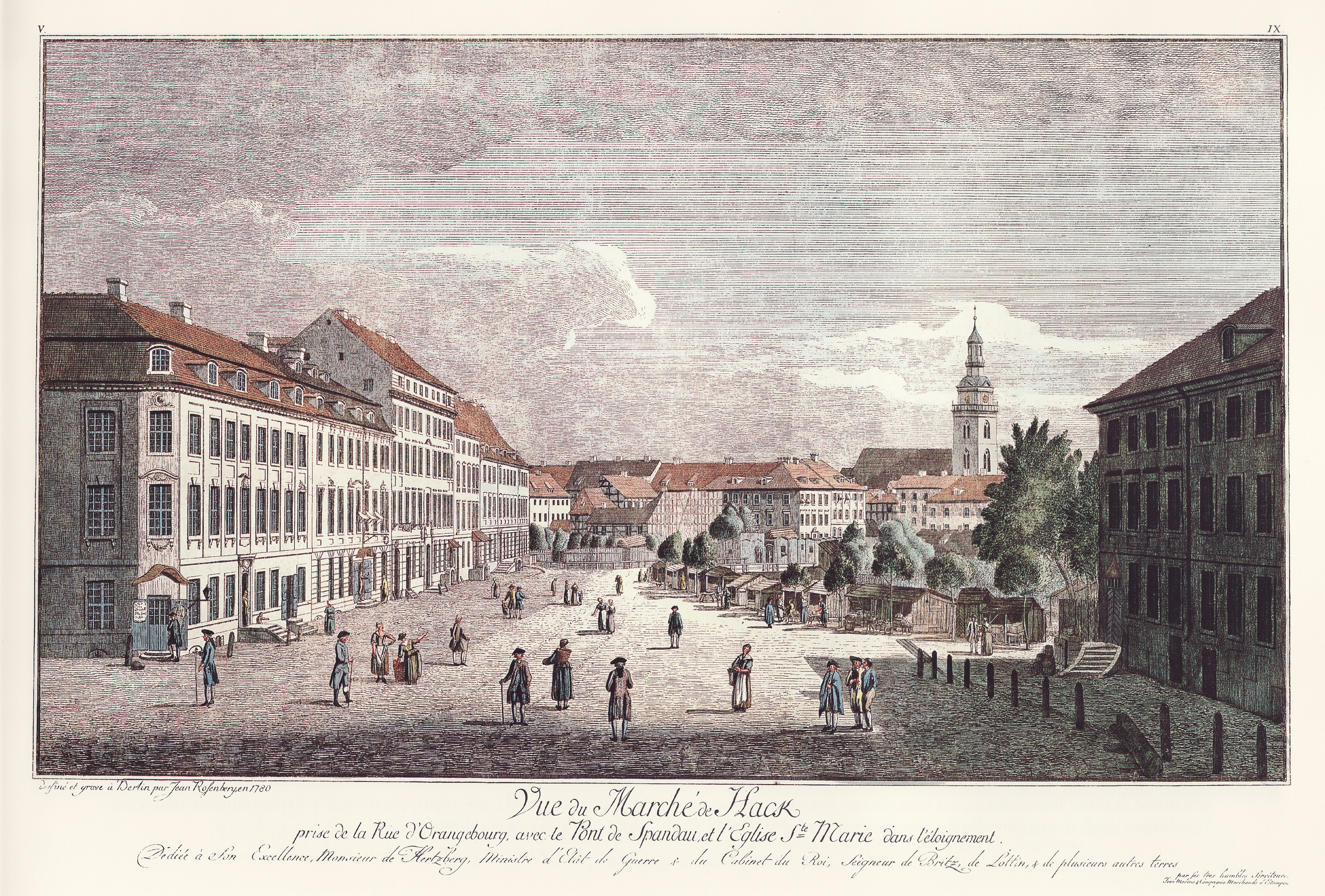
Hackischer Markt

== Hackescher Markt ==
In 1750, to facilitate expansion of Berlin, the King ordered the city's fortifications and the Spandau Gate to be torn down. Under Hacke's leadership, new houses and streets were built on what had previously been swamp land, and a spacious square was set out here. As a sign of his absolute satisfaction with the work, and in recognition of Hacke's services, the King commanded the square to be named the Hackescher Markt.

== Personal life ==
His marriage to Sophia Albertine von Creutz, daughter and heiress of Privy Councillor Ehrenreich Bogislaus von Creutz (1670–1733), produced one son, Prussian Major Friedrich Wilhelm von Hacke (died 1789).

Hans Christoph Friedrich Graf von Hacke died on 17 August 1754 in Berlin.
