= Old Prussian Cuirassier regiments =

The 13 Cuirassier regiments of Old Prussia (Kavallerieregimenter der altpreußischen Armee) were formed in the mid-17th to mid-18th centuries, and formed the basis of Frederick the Great's vaunted cavalry.

The cavalry regiments were the largest organization units of the old Prussian mounted troops. Between 1644 and 1806, 35 cavalry regiments were gradually formed. Initially called Regiments of Horse (Regiment zu Pferde), eventually these regiments were also differentiated according to different types of troops: Cuirassier Regiment, Dragoon Regiment, Hussar Regiment. The first mounted (horse) troops were simply called cavalry, then the dragoons (mounted infantry), and the hussars only midway through the 18th century. The size of the regiments varied between the types of troops. In the course of time, the regiments also changed within a cavalry type. At the time of Frederick the Great, Cuirassier and Dragoon regiments usually consisted of five squadrons, hussar regiments of ten squadrons. In the early-modern period (up to about 1800), units bore the name of their colonels, also called the Proprietor (Inhaber). If the regiment belonged to the king or one of the princes, he had colonels who commanded the regiments for him, and the regiment bore the name of the king. After the Prussian military reorganization in 1806, the units were given numbers.

== Army standard and reorganization ==
Until 1806, all army units were garrisoned in specific towns. They could stay there for years, absent wars, and might grow old and die in their garrison. In Berlin, for example, a traveler noted that the men were so underpaid that they could barely feed themselves; consequently, they indulged in lawlessness which their officers either could not or did not prevent.

== Cuirassier regiments ==
=== Cuirassier Regiment No 1 ===
- Horse Regiment also called Anhalt. Established 1665.
- 1665: John George von Anhalt-Dessau,
- 1693: Carl Friedrich von Schlippenbach,
- 1723: Kuno Ernst von Bredow,
- 1724: Wilhelm Dietrich von Buddenbrock,
- 1757: Hans Caspar von Krockow („Alt-Krockow“),
- 1759: Gustav Albrecht von Schlabrendorf, 1765: „vacat-Schlabrendorf“,
- 1768: Friedrich Wilhelm von Roeder,
- 1781: Levin Gideon Friedrich von Apenburg,
- 1784: Philipp Christian von Bohlen,
- 1787: Georg Dietrich von der Groeben,
- 1788: Diedrich Goswin von Bockum-Dolffs,
- 1805: Elias Maximilian Henckel von Donnersmarck.
- 1806: capitulation at Pasewalk.

=== Cuirassier Regiment No 2 ===
- Horse Regiment“ Established in 1665 as the Regiment Pfuhl.
- 1656 Georg Adam von Pfuhl,
- 1670 Johann Christoph von Strauß,
- 1672 Frederick I of Prussia „Prince of Prussia“,
- 1701 Frederick I of Prussia (Commanders of the Regiments :
  - 1688 Hans Joachim von Hagen
  - 1693 Imbert Rollaz du Rosey
  - 1703 Christian Siegmund von Aschersleben
  - 1709 Hans Christian von Rhoeden
  - 1713 Thomas August von Grote
- 1721 Otto Gustav von Lepel
- 1730 Adam Friedrich von Wreech)
- 1730 Prince Augustus William of Prussia „Princ of Prussia“, (Regimental Commanders under Prince August Wilhelm:
  - 1737 Johann Adolf von Möllendorff
  - 1741 Nikolaus Andreas von Katzler
  - 1746 Georg Wilhelm von Driesen
- 1756 Ludwig von Oppen)
- 1758 Heinrich von Preußen „Prinz von Preußen“,
  - 1768 Georg Ludwig von Wiersbitzki,
  - 1778 Christian Rudolf von Weyherr,
  - 1782 Christian Friedrich August von Saher,
- 1783 Karl August von Backhof,
- 1789 Gustav Ludwig von der Marwitz
- 1797 Peter Ewald von Maschitzky
- 1802 Andreas Dietrich von Schleinitz
- 1805 Karl Friedrich Hermann von Beeren. 1806 destroyed in Corps Blücher.

=== Cuirassier Regiment No 3 ===
The Regiment was established by Colonel Jakob von Bulow by advertising in 1672, and immediately received the name of the Leib Regiment at its foundation. The uniform was a buff-colored leather tunic with dark blue cuffs, collar and waistcoat. In 1805, tunic was changed to a white color. The coats and waistcoat were covered with a blue velvet trim, in which a white stripe (among the officers a golden dress). The men wore a bicorne hat, and during combat they had an iron skullcap underneath it. The regiment canton (recruiting district) was part of the Aschersleben, the third district of the Holzkreis, and the cities Kochstedt, Schönebeck, Frohsa, Saltz, Hamersleben, Mannsfeld and Gerbstädt, amounting to 4429 households comprised its recruiting district.

- 1672 Jakob von Bülow
- 1675 Ulrich Graf von Promnitz
- 1679 Alexander Magnus von Sydow
- 1679 Joachim Balthasar von Dewitz
- 1695 Adolph von Wangenheim
- 1709 Wolf Christoph von Hackeborn
- 1719 Gottfried Albrecht von Bredow
- 1726 Friedrich Wilhelm von Dewitz
- 1736 Adam Friedrich von Wreech
- 1746 Nikolaus Andreas von Katzler
- 1747 Johann Friedrich von Katte
- 1758 Robert Scipio von Lentulus
- 1778 Johann Rudolf von Merian
- 1782 Ernst Christian von Kospoth
- 1794 Leopold Heinrich von Goltz
- 1797 August Friedrich von der Droessel
- 1799 Ulrich Karl von Froreich
- 1801 Ernst Hermann von Kölichen
- 1805 Friedrich August Leopold Karl von Schwerin
- 1806 Capitulation at Prenzlau.

=== Cuirassier Regiment No 4 ===
„Horse Regiment“

- 1674 as „Dragoon Garde“ established.
- 1674 Joachim Ernst von Grumbkow
- 1682 Dietrich von Dohna
- 1686 Joachim Friedrich von Wreech,
- 1714 Peter von Blanckensee,
- 1733 Friedrich Leopold von Gessler,
- 1758 Johann Ernst von Schmettau,
- 1764 Hans Georg Woldeck von Arneburg,
- 1769 George Christoph von Arnim,
- 1785 Carl Friedrich von Mengden,
- 1796 Karl Friedrich Ernst Truchseß von Waldburg,
- 1800 Ernst Philipp von Wagenfeld.
- 1806 beim Reserve-Corps und wurde das neupreußische Kürassier-Regiment Nr. 1.

=== Cuirassier Regiment No 5 ===
Horse Regiment“

- 1683 as „Eller“ established.
- 1683 Heinrich de Briquemault de St. Loup
- 1692 Johann Sigismund von Heiden
- 1692 Philipp Wilhelm von Brandenburg
- 1712 Philip William, Margrave of Brandenburg-Schwedt
- 1771 Friedrich Wilhelm Lölhöffel von Löwensprung
- 1780 Maximilian von Mauschwitz
- 1782 Louis, Duke of Württemberg
- 1800 Abraham von Bailliodz.
- One squadron separated to create the New Prussian Dragoon regiment No. 2

=== Cuirassier Regiment No 6 ===
„Horse Regiment“

- 1688 as „Du Hamel“ established.
- 1689 Franz du Hamel,
- 1702 Charles de l’Ostange,
- 1704 Benjamin Hieronymus Courold du Portail,
- 1715 William Gustav of Anhalt-Dessau,
- 1737 Prince Frederick Henry Eugen of Anhalt-Dessau,
- 1744 Christoph Ludwig von Stille,
- 1753 Georg Philipp Gottlob von Schönaich (until 1758 „Jung-Schönaich“),
- 1759 Heinrich Rudolph von Vasold,
- 1769 Just Rudolf von Seelhorst,
- 1779 Christoph Ernst von Hoverbeck,
- 1781 Hans Heinrich Ludwig von Rohr,
- 1787 Carl August von Sachsen-Weimar,
- 1794 Karl Wilhelm von Byern,
- 1800 Christian Heinrich von Quitzow.
- Capitulation at Anklam.

=== Cuirassier Regiment No 7 ===
„Horse Regiment“

- 1688 as Dragoner-Regiment „Sonsfeld“ established.
- 1688 Friedrich Wilhelm von Wittenhorst-Sonsfeld,
- 1711 George Friedrich von der Albe,
- 1717 Ludwig von Wylich und Lottum,
- 1729 Karl Friedrich von Papstein,
- 1733 Friedrich Siegmund von Bredow,
- 1755 Georg Wilhelm von Driesen,
- 1758 Christian Siegmund von Horn,
- 1762 Leopold Sebastian von Manstein,
- 1777 Gustav Ludwig von der Marwitz,
- 1784 Friedrich Adolf, Count von Kalckreuth,
- 1788 Otto Friedrich von Ilow,
- 1792 Hans Friedrich Heinrich von Borstell,
- 1804 Heinrich August Friedrich von Reitzenstein.
- 1806 Capitulation at Magdeburg.

=== Cuirassier Regiment No 8 ===
Horse Regiment

1691 as "Bayreuth" founded. 1691 Christian Heinrich von Bayreuth-Kulmbach, 1712 Albert Wolfgang von Bayreuth-Kulmbach, 1716 Stephan von Dewitz, 1723 Friedrich von Egeln, 1734 Friedrich Siegmund von Waldow („Jung-Waldow“), 1742 Friedrich Wilhelm von Rochow, 1757 Friedrich Wilhelm von Seydlitz, 1774 Maximilian Sigmund von Pannewitz, 1787 Karl Friedrich Adam von Schlitz gen. Görtz, 1797 Ludwig Ferdinand Friedrich von Heising. 1806 capitulation at Pasewalk.

=== Cuirassier Regiment No 9 ===
Horse Regiment

- 1691 as „Schöning“ established.
- 1691 Hans Ehrenreich von Schöning,
- 1703 Philipp Ludwig von Canstein,
- 1706 Hans Heinrich von Katte,
- 1741 Hermann von Wartensleben,
- 1741 Johann Adolf von Möllendorff,
- 1743 Bernhard Heinrich von Bornstedt,
- 1751 Johann Carl Friedrich von Schönaich-Carolath also called „Carolath-Beuthen“ (after 1753 also called „Alt-Schönaich“),
- 1758 Jakob Friedrich von Bredow,
- 1769 Friedrich Wilhelm von Podewils,
- 1784 Christian Friedrich von Braunschweig,
- 1787 Johann Wilhelm von Manstein,
- 1797 Jakob Friedrich von Holtzendorff.
- 1806 capitulation at Pasewalk.

=== Cuirassier Regiment No 10 ===
- Gens d’armes“
- 1688 as 3. Kompanie der „Grands Mousquetaires“ established.
- 1691 Dubislav Gneomar von Natzmer,
- 1739 Wolf Adolf von Pannwitz,
- 1743 Georg Conrad von der Goltz,
- 1747 Nikolaus Andreas von Katzler,
- 1761 Friedrich Albert von Schwerin,
- 1768 Hans Friedrich von Krusemarck,
- 1775 Joachim Bernhard von Prittwitz,
- 1777 Emanuel Friedrich von Bredow,
- 1793 Karl Friedrich von Elsner.
- 1806 After battle at Wichmannsdorf, capitulated at Anklam.

=== Cuirassier Regiment No 11 ===
Leib-Carabiniers“

- 1691 as Dragoner-Regiment „Brandt“.
- 1691 Paul von Brandt,
- 1692 Albrecht Friedrich von Brandenburg-Schwedt
- 1731 Karl Ludwig Truchsess von Waldburg
- 1738 Hermann von Wartensleben
- 1741 Kaspar Ludwig von Bredow
- 1751 Peter von Pennavaire
- 1759 Joachim Christian von Bandemer
- 1764–1768 Vacant
- 1768 Reinhold Friedrich von Hoverbeck
- 1770 Reimar von Kleist
- 1775 Philipp Christian von Bohlen
- 1784 Heinrich Sebastian von Reppert
- 1794 August von Bismarck.
- 1806 capitulation atPasewalk.

=== Cuirassier Regiment No 12 ===
Horse Regiment“

- 1704 as Dragoner-Regiment „Wittgenstein“.
- 1704 August von Wittgenstein
- 1711 Ludolf von Pannewitz
- 1715 William Gustav of Anhalt-Dessau
- 1715 Benjamin Hieronymus Courold du Portail
- 1718 Georg Levin von Winterfeld
- 1728 Arnold Christopher von Waldow (1734–1742 „Alt-Waldow“)
- 1743 Friedrich Wilhelm von Kyaw
- 1759 Johann Heinrich Friedrich von Spaen
- 1763 Georg Ludwig von Dalwig
- 1796 Jakob Friedrich von Berg
- 1798 Georg Ehrenreich von Werther
- 1803 Karl Wilhelm von Bünting.
- 1806 capitulation at Pasewalk.

=== Cuirassier Regiment No 13 ===
Garde du Corps“

* 1740 as Lehreskadron.

- 1740 Fredrick II of Prussia,
- 1786 Frederick William II of Prussia,
- 1797 Frederick William III of Prussia. 1806 concluded as Garde du Corps. Reinstated.
