= Charles-Emmanuel de Warnery =

Charles-Emanuel de Warnery
- Born: 13 March 1720; Morges, Canton Vaud, Swiss Confederation
- Died: 3 May 1776 (aged 56); Breslau, Silesia, Kingdom of Prussia
- Military career
- Allegiance: Kingdom of Sardinia 1734–1737; Russian Empire 1737–1743; Kingdom of Prussia; Polish–Lithuanian Commonwealth 1766–1776
- Service years: 1734–1757
- Conflicts: War of Polish Succession; War of Austrian Succession; Seven Years' War
- Awards: Pour le Mérite

Charles Emanuel de Warnery (13 March 1720 – 3 May 1776) was a royal Prussian colonel, later a royal Polish general. He was born 13 March 1720 at Morges on Lake Geneva, Canton Vaud, served in the Sardinian service on the Regiment Desportes, and participated in the Upper Italy campaign against Austria during the War of Polish Succession. He briefly served in the Russian army during the Russo-Swedish War. In 1743, he joined the Prussian army and served in the War of Austrian Succession and the Seven Years' War. Upon his retirement in 1758, he entered a second career in military writing, developing commentaries on military tactics, particularly those of mounted troops, from the time of the Caesars to Frederick the Great.

== Early life ==
Warnery was born 13 March 1720 in Morges at the upper end of Lake Geneva in the Swiss canton of Vaud.

== Military career ==
At the age of fourteen, he entered the military service of the King of Sardinia. He participated in the Battle of Parma on 29 June and the Battle of Guastalla on 19 September, both in 1734, in the War of Polish Succession. After peace was concluded in 1735, he took leave and in 1737, when the Austro-Turkish War broke out against the Turks, he served as a lieutenant in the Infantry Regiment Königsegg and as an adjutant of his countryman, Robert Scipio von Lentulus.

Warnery was wounded in the Russo-Swedish War on 3 September 1741. In 1742, he left Russian service and entered the Prussian army as a Rittmeister (cavalry captain) in Dubislav Gneomar von Natzmer's Hussar Regiment, a transition expedited by the French Ambassador in Berlin, Count Courtin. There he became a close friend of Friedrich Wilhelm von Seydlitz, who also served in the regiment. During a skirmish, he and about 30 hussars were trapped at Krzanowice and forced to surrender; he entered for the first time into Austrian captivity, with several of his comrades, including Friedrich Wilhelm von Seydlitz.

At the head of his squadron in the Second Silesian War, he fought at the battles of Hohenfriedberg, Soor, and Catholic Hennersdorf, and was promoted from the youngest Rittmeister to major during the campaign. In the last winter of the war, near Zittau, he and Seydlitz surprised the Austrian rear-guard that was plodding slowly through the back roads, attacked and routed them. After the autumn review of 1746, King Frederick presented him with a costly Turkish sabre as a mark of his esteem and appreciation.

=== Service in Seven Years' War ===
At the beginning of the Seven Years' War, he was elevated to the rank of lieutenant colonel. In addition, he was elevated to the nobility and received the Pour le Mérite for his achievements in the Battle of Lobositz in 1756. There he took possession of Stolpen. The Austrian commandant, General Johann Adolph von Liebenau, capitulated because he saw the impossibility of defending himself. In reply to a report, King Frederick wrote Vous avez fait des merveilles, (You have done wonders).

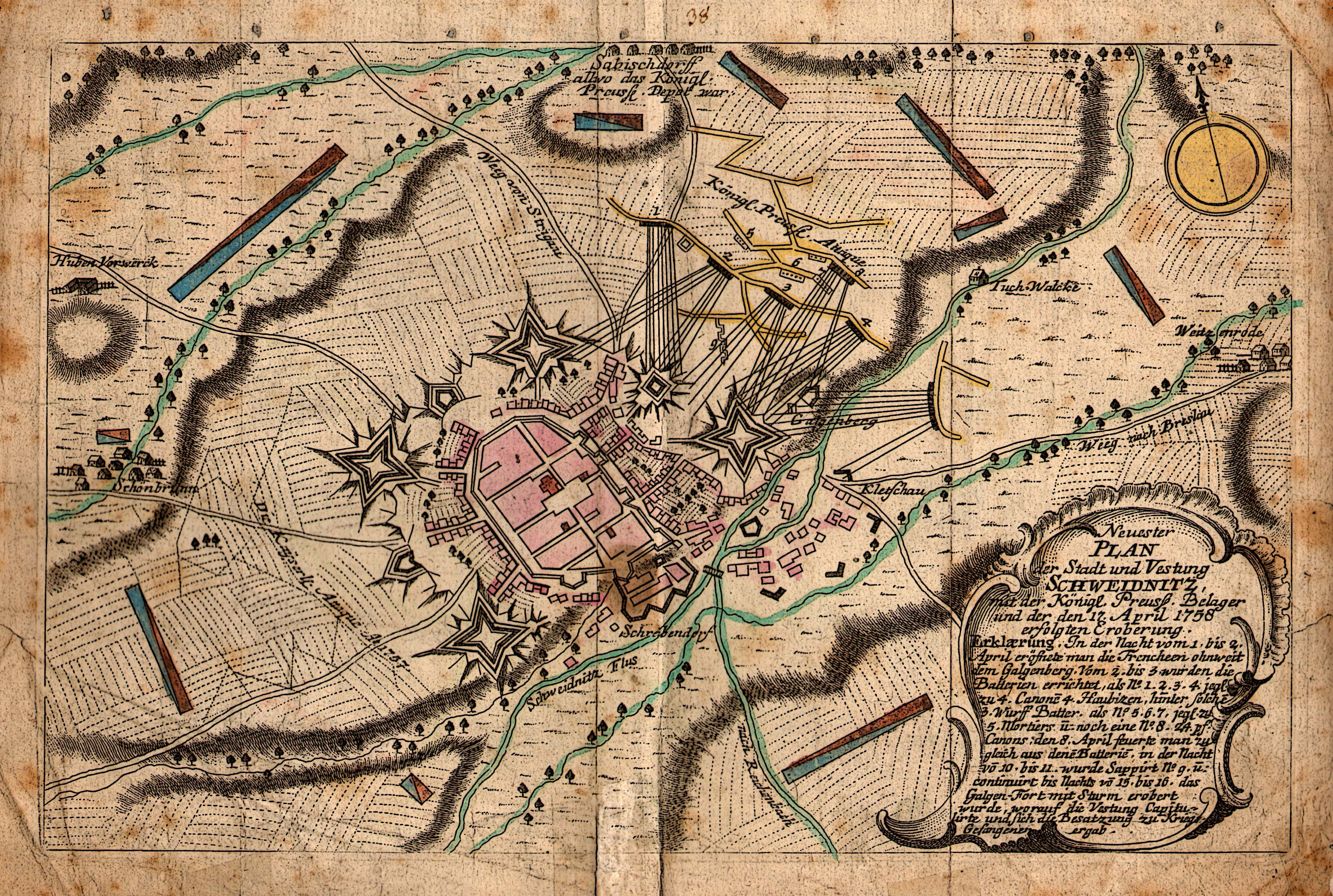
The Austrians besieged Schweidnitz in 1758, trapping Warnery and half his regiment there.

When General Hartwig Karl von Wartenberg was killed on 2 May 1757 at the fighting near Prague, Warnery was promoted to colonel of Wartenberg's Hussar Regiment (later called Hussar Regiment No. 3). He was also part of the brilliant cavalry action at the error-fraught Battle of Kolin during which his and Seydlitz's cavalry, and that of Paul von Werner, prevented the Saxon army from attacking the Prussian flank. That autumn, the Austrians besieged Schweidnitz; Warnery was trapped there with half of his regiment. In the capitulation of the fortress in the autumn of 1757, he fell into Austrian hands for a second time as a prisoner of war. After his exchange, Warnery insisted on a court-martial to clear his name: he was exonerated. When he requested this procedure also for the generals who were involved in the capitulation of the fortress, the courts declined. Considering this a dishonor, Warnery quit his service to Prussia and retired to his wife's estates.

== Military science ==
In his retirement, Warnery found satisfaction in military writing, producing commentaries on Roman empire achievements, the development of cavalry, comparisons of Turkish and Russian tactics, and an analysis of Frederick's campaigns in the Seven Years' War. Warnery's achievements as a writer were possibly more significant than his military accomplishments. His numerous works were republished long after their composition. According to his origins in French-speaking Vaud, he wrote in the French language. One unauthorized edition first appeared in 1766 in German, so he wrote an extended edition of Remarques sur le militaire et le marine des Turcs et Russes, published in Breslau (1771). His Remarks on Cavalry of Turks and Russians appeared in English in 1798 and this is the only work translated into English. Some 19th century critics of military tactics considered his analysis of Frederick's cavalry to be among the best, but acknowledge that Warnery's opinions and analysis of cavalry units, their structure, training and tactics reflect Seydlitz's opinions. Seydlitz's own regiment served as a basis for Warnery's analysis of cavalry.

=== Publications ===
The State Library of Berlin lists the following publications:

- Remarks on cavalry, tr. [by G.F. Koehler].(1798)
- Sämtliche Schriften: Bemerkungen über das türkische und russische ..., Volume 1-6 (Helwieg, 1787)
- Feldzüge Friedrichs des Zweyten, Königs von Preußen, seit 1756 bis 1762
- Commentaires sur les commentaires du Comte de Turpin sur Montec 1777, 779
- Mélange de remarques, sur-tout sur César, et autres auteurs. 1782
- Remarques sur l'essai général de tactique de Guibert. 1782
- Remarques sur le militaire des Turcs et sur la Façon de les co. 1770
- Remarques sur le militaire des Turcs et des Russes. 1771
- Des Herrn Generalmajor von Warnery sämtliche Schriften. 1785, 1791
- Campagnes de Fréderic II, Roi de Prusse, de 1756 à 1762. 1788
- Feldzüge Friedrichs des Zweyten, Königs von Preußen, seit 1756
- Remarques sur le militaire des Turces et de Russes .... 1771

== Polish service and death ==
The Polish king, Stanislaus Poniatowski, appointed him general and adjutant general in 1776, but he lived mostly in Silesia, in Langenhof near Oels, on property which his wife, Louise Henriette von Koschenbahr (19 February 1725–20 March 1799), had brought to their marriage. He died in Breslau on 8 May 1786, a relatively young man, aged 56 years.

Military offices
Preceded by Hartwig Karl von Wartenberg	Proprietor of Hussar Regiment Nr. 3; 1757–1758	Succeeded by Christian Möhring
