= Friedrich Wilhelm von Seydlitz =

Prussian cavalry general (1721–1773)

Generalleutnant Friedrich Wilhelm von Seydlitz
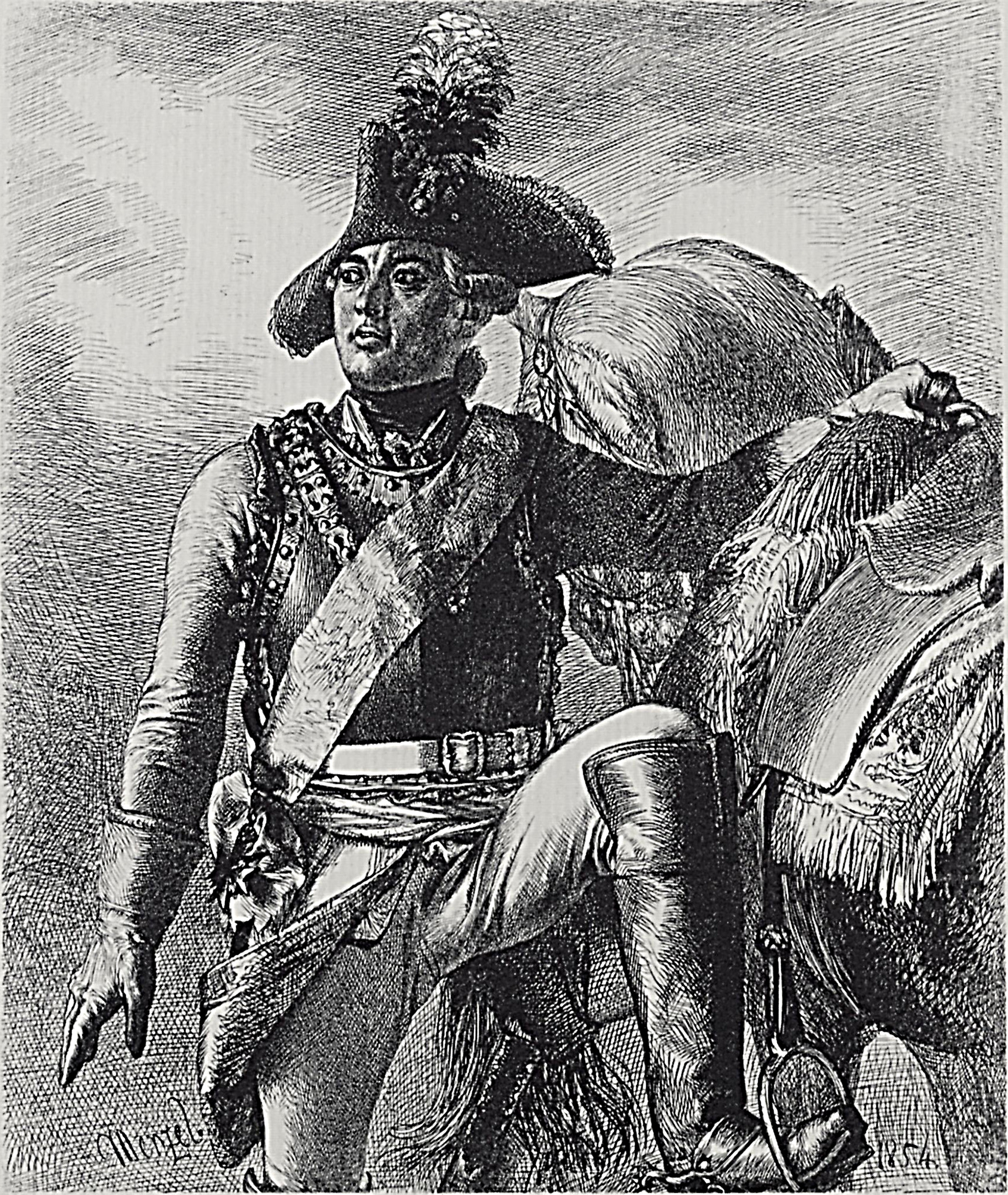
- 1854 portrait
- Born: 3 February 1721; Kalkar, Duchy of Clèves, Holy Roman Empire
- Died: 8 November 1773 (aged 52); Ohlau, Silesia, Kingdom of Prussia, Holy Roman Empire
- Military career
- Allegiance: Kingdom of Prussia
- Branch: Prussian Army
- Service years: 1739–1773
- Rank: Lieutenant general; Cavalry
- Conflicts: War of Austrian Succession; Seven Years' War
- Awards: Order of the Black Eagle; Pour le Mérite; Name inscribed on the equestrian statue of Frederick the Great

Friedrich Wilhelm Freiherr von Seydlitz (3 February 1721 – 8 November 1773) was a Prussian officer, lieutenant general, and among the most renowned of the Prussian cavalry generals. He commanded one of the first hussar squadrons of Frederick the Great's army and is credited with the development of the Prussian cavalry to its efficient level of performance in the Seven Years' War. His cavalryman father retired and then died while Seydlitz was still young. Subsequently, he was mentored by Frederick William, Margrave of Brandenburg-Schwedt. Seydlitz's acclaimed horsemanship and recklessness combined to make him a stand-out subaltern, and he emerged as a remarkable Rittmeister (cavalry captain) in the War of Austrian Succession (1740–1748) during the First and Second Silesian Wars.

Seydlitz became legendary throughout the Prussian Army both for his leadership and for his reckless courage. During the Seven Years' War, he came into his own as a cavalry general, known for his coup d'œil, his ability to assess at a glance the entire battlefield situation and to understand intuitively what needed to be done: he excelled at converting the king's directives into flexible tactics. At the Battle of Rossbach, his cavalry was instrumental in routing the French and Imperial armies. His cavalry subsequently played an important role in crushing the Habsburg and Imperial left flank at the Battle of Leuthen. Seydlitz was wounded in battle several times. After the Battle of Kunersdorf in August 1759, he semi-retired to recover from his wounds, charged with the protection of the city of Berlin. He was not healthy enough to campaign again until 1761.

Frederick rewarded him with Order of the Black Eagle on the field after the Battle of Rossbach; he had already received the Pour le Mérite for his action at the Battle of Kolin. Although Seydlitz was estranged from Frederick for several years, the two were reconciled during Seydlitz's final illness. Seydlitz died in 1773, and Frederick's heirs included his name on the equestrian statue of Frederick the Great in Berlin, in a place of honor.

== Early life ==
Seydlitz was born on 3 February 1721, in Kalkar in the Duchy of Cleves, where his father, Daniel Florian von Seydlitz, was a major of Prussian cavalry with the Cuirassier Regiment Markgraf Friedrich Wilhelm of Brandenburg-Schwedt No. 5. In 1726, his father left military service and moved the family to Schwedt, where he became a forestry master in East Prussia; the senior Seydlitz died in 1728, leaving a widow and children in restricted financial circumstances. (Note: Sources differ on the number of siblings Seydlitz had. Lawley (1852, p. 10) reports two sisters and a brother; Poten (1892, pp. 94–101) simply says three children total.) Limited schooling was available to young Seydlitz; sources differ whether he knew how to speak and write in French, the lingua franca of Frederick the Great's court. One biographer, Bernhard von Poten, maintained that his German was good, and if he knew French, he preferred German and wrote it with a "fine, firm hand, unusually correct, in well-formed sentences and with apt expression", and he knew enough Latin to express himself well. His future sovereign, Frederick, always addressed him in German.

By Seydlitz's seventh year, he could ride a horse well, raced with older boys; he was, by most accounts, a wild and high-spirited child. At the age of fourteen he went as a page to the court of the Margrave Frederick Wilhelm of Brandenburg-Schwedt, who had been his father's colonel. The Margrave was a grandson of the Great Elector, and a nephew to both Frederick I of Prussia and Leopold of Anhalt Dessau. Himself a reckless man, the "Mad" Margrave inspired in young Seydlitz a passion for feats of daredevil horsemanship. Seydlitz did not limit this passion to horses: the Margrave once dared him to ride a wild stag, which he did. Seydlitz became a skilled horseman, and many stories tell of his feats, the best known of which involved riding between the sails of a windmill in full swing. Seydlitz remained in his position as a page to the Margrave until King Frederick William appointed him as cornet in the Margrave's Cuirassier Regiment No. 5 (his father's old regiment) on 13 February 1740.

== Military career ==
Promotions

- Cornet: 13 February 1740
- Rittmeister (captain of cavalry): 1743
- Major: 28 July 1745
- Lieutenant colonel: 21 September 1752
- Colonel: 1755
- Major general: 20 June 1757
- Lieutenant general: 5 November 1757
- Inspector General of Cavalry in Silesia: 1763

Seydlitz's first months as a cornet were made difficult by the regimental colonel, who considered him a spy for the margrave, and abused him by sending him on useless errands and generally making it clear that the cornet was no match for the colonel. Within a year of Seydlitz's commission, the old King Frederick William died and his son, Frederick II of Prussia, ascended to the throne. Frederick claimed Silesia from the Habsburg's Maria Theresa, and made a broad appeal to arms. The Margrave's regiment played an important role in the ensuing war, during which Seydlitz came to the notice of the king several times. Once, when Frederick asked the caliber of the artillery shelling the Prussian line, opinions were divided and vague. Seydlitz rode in front of the battery, halting in their line of fire. When he saw a ball hit the ground, he picked it up, wrapped it in his handkerchief and presented it to the king.

On 22 May 1742, near Opawa (Troppau) in Silesia, while stationed with his regiment in Kranowitz, during the First Silesian War, the regimental colonel ordered him to take 30 men and hold a village post until infantry came to his assistance; despite heavy fire, the grudging colonel did not send reinforcements. Realizing what had happened, the brigade's general took three squadrons of heavy cavalry to relieve Seydlitz, but these were turned back by fire from the Austrian line. Subsequently, Seydlitz was forced to surrender his small unit. He entered into Austrian captivity with several of his closest comrades, including Charles de Warnery.

Frederick exchanged an Austrian captain for Cornet Seydlitz. Upon his return from captivity, Seydlitz had a choice to wait for the first lieutenancy that became available in a cuirassier regiment, or take the immediate command of a troop of hussars, as a captain. Hussars were the newest form of service in the Prussian army, and not as prestigious an assignment as cuirassiers, but Seydlitz chose the immediate promotion to a lesser unit. In 1743, the king made him a Rittmeister (captain) in the 4th Hussars. He entirely skipped the rank of lieutenant. With the 4th Hussars, he was stationed in the city of Trebnitz, and he brought his squadron to a state of conspicuous efficiency.

In August 1744, the king entered Bohemia, took Prague, and then moved south. Lieutenant General Count Nassau led the vanguard, and Seydlitz participated with the Natzmer Hussars, commanded by Major Hans Heinrich Adam Schütz, a violent man of whose conduct of warfare Seydlitz disapproved. (Note: Schütz reportedly dragooned peasants to serve as his guides, and then executed them when he was finished with them; he burned villages, including churches, and generally waged war on Silesian peasants. Lawley (1852, pp. 10–14)) Seydlitz served through the Second Silesian War. On 22 May, Hans Karl von Winterfeldt, trusted by the king as a good judge of character, reported to Frederick: "Certainly, at Hohenfriedberg, on the 4 June, [Seydlitz] captured the Saxon general [Georg Sigismund] von Schlichting personally, after he had cut the reins from him." Based largely on his conduct at Hohenfriedberg and Winterfeldt's recommendation, Frederick promoted Seydlitz to major on 28 July at the unusually young age of twenty-four.

Seydlitz led his squadron at the Battle of Soor on 30 September, scouting the enemy's position before the battle, and then participating in the action. He was also present in the engagement at Katholisch-Hennersdorf on 23 November, which proved convincingly to Frederick the benefit of close support during a cavalry charge. At the successful action on 27 November, Seydlitz led 15 squadrons in an attack on the Austrian rear guard. The Austrians were dispersed and nearly destroyed.

=== Development of cavalry tactics ===
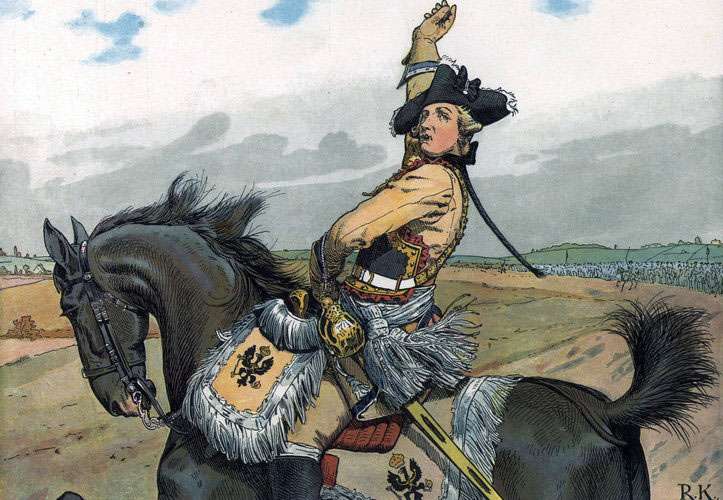
Seydlitz smoked a pipe, and when he tossed it away, it was the sign for his troopers to proceed. Depicted here at the Battle of Rossbach, in a section of a history painting by Richard Knötel.

After Frederick concluded the peace on 25 December 1748, Seydlitz returned with his squadron to Trebnitz. In the subsequent years of peace, Seydlitz developed flexible cavalry tactics. He assembled a plan on tactical form and training for the Prussian cavalry and presented it to the king. Frederick approved the procedures and Seydlitz established a rigorous training program. He would leave his own estate by jumping the gate; he required similar horsemanship from all his men, regardless of whether they were cuirassiers, hussars or dragoons. They had to be capable of galloping across broken fields, wheeling in formation, and riding in close action. Furthermore, they had to be prepared to support any movement of infantry, or to react to any action from the enemy. Under Seydlitz's direction, possibly influenced by the ideas of Frederik Sirtema van Grovestins, Prussian cavalry learned to use only their swords, as pistols or carbines could not be fired with accuracy and had to be reloaded. Frederick set up straw dummies for his troopers to shoot; their shots were woefully inaccurate, but Seydlitz's tactics demonstrated that the troopers could hit their target with a sword every time. Generally, cavalry horses were the sturdy Trakehners, from Frederick's stud farm in Trakehnen, East Prussia.

On 21 September 1752, after a successful review in which the different cavalry forms demonstrated their competencies, the king promoted Seydlitz to lieutenant colonel and the commander-in-chief of cavalry and, on 13 October of the same year, to the commander of the Dragoon Regiment Württemberg No. 12, whose staff was at Treptow. Frederick was not satisfied with the regiment's performance, and instructed Seydlitz to "put it back into order". In 1753 Frederick appointed Seydlitz to the command of the 8th Cuirassiers. In Seydlitz's hands, this regiment soon became a model for the rest of the Prussian Army's mounted force. In 1755 Frederick promoted him to colonel.

By the start of the Seven Years' War, Seydlitz's transformed cavalry had become Frederick's pride and joy: it had unrivaled training and an esprit de corps bolstered by Frederick's confidence in its members, and by their confidence in Seydlitz. The king had issued orders that no Prussian cavalryman would allow himself to be attacked without a commensurate response, under penalty of being cashiered; consequently, Prussian cavalrymen were active, impetuous and aggressive. For the king, Seydlitz's cavalry became the dynamic factor in the army of the state, and would be the tool by which Frederick could challenge empires. In 1756, Seydlitz's cavalry became Frederick's weapon of choice.

== Seven Years' War ==
In May 1757, in defiance of the custom of holding the heavy cavalry in reserve, Seydlitz brought his regiment forward to join the advance guard at the Battle of Prague. Here he nearly lost his life attempting to ride through a marshy pool; his horse became stuck in quicksand and his troopers pulled him away. At the Prussian loss at Kolin in June 1757, he and a cavalry brigade checked the Austrian pursuit by a brilliant charge. Two days later, the king promoted him to major general and awarded him the Pour le Mérite. Seydlitz felt he had deserved the promotion for a long time, for he responded to Hans Joachim von Zieten's congratulations by saying, "It was high time, Excellency, if they wanted more work out of me. I am already thirty-six."

Another example of his leadership and his coup d'œil, the ability to see at a glance what needed to be done, occurred after the Battle of Kolin. The loss at Kolin forced the king to lift the siege at Prague. The king's brother, Augustus William, took command of the army and ordered the retreat from Prague. Seydlitz was attached to the advanced corps of Karl Christoph von Schmettau in a brigade of ten squadrons. As Seydlitz's wing entered Lusatia, near the town of Zittau, the Austrians were present in force, and Seydlitz with his squadrons were trapped in the town. Tricking the Austrians into thinking his troop was a foraging party, his cavalry burst on the Austrian cavalry before they could climb into their saddles. Seydlitz led his cavalry in an escape, in close column, and was quickly out of sight.

=== Battle of Rossbach ===
On the morning of the Battle of Rossbach, Frederick passed over two senior generals and placed Seydlitz in command of the whole of the cavalry, much to those men's annoyance and to Seydlitz's satisfaction. At Rossbach, Seydlitz's coup d'œil and his understanding of the king's objectives led to battlefield success. After positioning the cavalry in two ranked lines, he watched the French army move for several minutes, while puffing on his pipe; his troopers never took their eyes off him. When he threw his pipe away, this was the signal they had waited for: the first line of massed squadrons surged forward, smashing the unprepared French in the flank. Typically, cavalry action in the mid-18th century meant a single cavalry charge; the cavalry would spend the rest of the action pursuing fleeing troops. At Rossbach, though, not content with this single attack, Seydlitz called his second formation of squadrons in another charge; he then withdrew all 38 squadrons into a copse, where they regrouped under cover of the trees. (Note: The K2169 (a county roadway) passing through Reichertswerben is named von Seydlitz Strasse. Google Maps. Seydlitz Strasse in Reichertswerben. Accessed 17 April 2017. Today, this is the site of the Rossbach battle diorama. Reichertswerben village. 03. – 05. November 2017, Biwak in Reichardtswerben, anlässlich des 260. Jahrestages der Schlacht bei Roßbach, Diorama. 8 November 2017.) Without waiting for new orders from the king, Seydlitz deployed the Prussian cavalry a third time; this proved a critical factor in the battle. As trained, Seydlitz's squadrons charged headlong into the French columns: a massive wall of horses galloping flank to flank, their riders flashing swords and maneuvering at full speed. By the end of the battle, only seven infantry battalions of Frederick's army had fired a shot; the rest of the victory had been the work of Seydlitz's 38 squadrons and Karl Friedrich von Moller's artillery.

That day, the Prussians took as trophies 72 cannons (62 percent of the French/Imperial artillery), seven flags, and 21 standards. With some 3,500 horsemen and 20 cannons, plus a portion of Prince Henry's regiment of infantry, the Prussian army had defeated the combined armies of two European powers, France and the Holy Roman Empire. The tactics at Rossbach became a landmark in the history of military art. The same night, on the field, the king awarded Seydlitz the Order of the Black Eagle, and promoted him to lieutenant general. Seydlitz had been wounded during the melée and he remained out of action for four months, nursed by a lady in Leipzig.

=== Campaign 1758–1759 ===
Seydlitz rejoined the king in 1758 and on 25 August, at the Battle of Zorndorf, Seydlitz's cavalry again secured the victory. He led thirty-six squadrons into a mass of Russian cavalry mingled with infantry. This charge broke the Russian right wing and sent them running for the woods. At the Prussian debacle at Hochkirch, on 14 October 1758, he covered the Prussian retreat with 108 squadrons, and in the disaster of Kunersdorf, on 12 August 1759, he received another severe wound in a hopeless attempt to storm a hill held by the Russians; his 8th Cuirassiers was one of the few intact regiments at the end of the battle. While recuperating in Berlin, he helped organize a defense of the city during the Austro-Russian raid (October 1760). Although he was unable to prevent the Russians from briefly occupying the city, Frederick later praised Seydlitz for his conduct.

Seydlitz's health frequently kept him off the battlefield, and he did not reappear at the front until 1761. Then, he received command of a wing of Prince Henry's army, composed of troops of all arms, and many of his fellow officers expressed doubts as to his fitness for this command, as his service had been with the cavalry exclusively. Subsequently, though, at Freiberg on 29 October 1762, his direction of both his infantry and his cavalry in turn decided the outcome of the battle.

== Later life ==
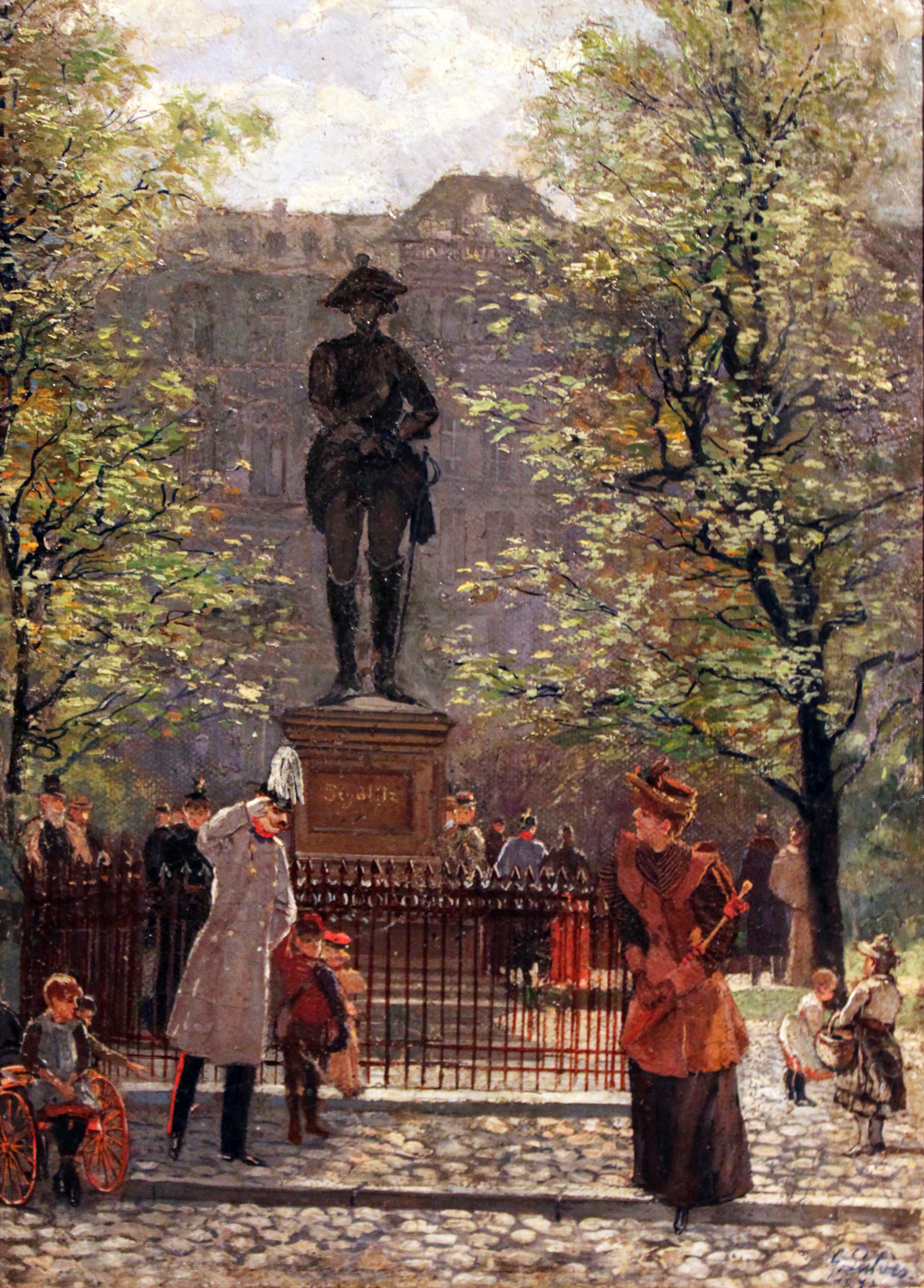
Statue of Seydlitz at Wilhelmplatz in Berlin (painting from 1872)

After the Seven Years' War concluded with the Treaty of Hubertusburg (1763), Seydlitz became inspector general of the cavalry in Silesia, where eleven regiments were permanently stationed and where Frederick sent all his most promising officers to be trained. In 1767, Frederick promoted Seydlitz to general of cavalry.

Seydlitz's later years were marred by domestic unhappiness. On 18 April 1760 he married Susanna Johanna Albertine von Hacke, daughter of Hans Christoph Friedrich Graf von Hacke. In October 1764 the court chamberlain Lehndorff recorded in his diary that Seydlitz was divorcing his wife, then nineteen years old, after she had been unfaithful to him with a footman; Seydlitz kept the children, and she was required to pay him 40,000 thalers and was banished to Pomerania. Lawley attributes her infidelity to Seydlitz's neglect of her, while Jarymowycz attributes it to syphilis. Seydlitz left two daughters. The elder married first a war councillor named von Massow in Breslau, from whom she separated; in 1785 she married a Polish count, Monczinsky, and was divorced from him as well. According to Lawley, she converted to Catholicism and died in a madhouse in Brieg, while the younger daughter lived to old age and died in poverty in Lower Lusatia.

By the end of the decade, some misunderstanding brought an end to his formerly close friendship with the king. Seydlitz's health had been declining since the wounds he received at Kunersdorf in 1759: his friend Warnery recorded that the wound was accompanied by "a kind of apoplexy" which deprived him for some days of the power of speech, and in 1760 he still suffered from a paralysis of the jaw that required a bandage. In April 1772 he suffered a stroke that left the right side of his body paralysed for a time. He took the waters at Carlsbad; according to Blankenburg, the cure brought no improvement, and at the Silesian review that year he could scarcely keep himself in the saddle. Writing to Prince Henry on 14 May 1773, Frederick attributed the stroke to an abscess in the head. In August 1773, during Seydlitz's last illness, Frederick visited him at Ohlau (now Oława, Poland); according to Blankenburg, nothing certain is known of their conversation except that the King repeatedly said "I cannot do without him!" Seydlitz died at Ohlau on 8 November 1773.

Accounts of his final illness differ. The Genealogischer Militairischer Calender of 1787 states that he died "an einer gänzlichen Abzehrung" (of a complete wasting away). An anonymous sketch in the Berlin Historisch-genealogischer Kalender for 1789 adds that this wasting was the consequence of a life "enjoyed too early and too continuously" (zu früh und zu anhaltend genossenen Lebens), and König's biographical dictionary of 1791 says that he died of "an illness brought on him by his passions", without naming it. The 1911 Encyclopædia Britannica states that he died of paralysis. Karl August Varnhagen von Ense's biography of 1834, followed closely by Lawley's English biography of 1852, gives a fuller account of his last years. According to them, a subordinate brought him two Circassian women, whose company worsened his condition; at the King's visit he would not look at Frederick because the illness had disfigured his face; and the true nature of his illness was concealed from the King, who "always called it apoplexy". The reliability of Varnhagen's biography has been questioned: the historian Manfred Laubert wrote in 1900 that, in his account of Seydlitz at the battle of Kunersdorf, Varnhagen had invented a fairy tale "almost out of nothing" (beinahe aus dem Nichts heraus ein Märchen … erfunden).

== Character ==
Seydlitz was generally admired for the superb coup d'œil that allowed him to utilize the cavalry to its full potential. Bernhard von Poten wrote that at Trebnitz, where Seydlitz was stationed with his hussar squadron after 1745, he lived above all for the service and brought the training of his hussars to a high standard.

His private manner has been described in conflicting ways. The anonymous Briefe eines alten preußischen Officiers (1790), attributed to Rudolph Wilhelm von Kaltenborn, described him as so taciturn that he scarcely spoke twenty-four words in twenty-four hours, and said that his conversation turned only on riding, drinking and the indiscretions of youth. Blankenburg's biography of 1797, drawing on the recollections of Hohenstock, who had served as an officer in Seydlitz's squadron at Trebnitz, disputed this: the officers gathered at Seydlitz's quarters in the evening, but not to gamble or drink, both of which he "positively hated" (geradezu haßte); Blankenburg asked where the author of the Briefe could have learned that Seydlitz knew how to talk only of drinking.

In the Allgemeine Deutsche Biographie (1892), Poten wrote that the picture of Seydlitz as a drinker and a coarse libertine (Trinker und rohen Wüstling) went back to his years at Trebnitz and was "utterly false" (grundfalsch), as shown above all by the descriptions of Warnery, who had served with him.

Writing in 1828, Friedrich Wilhelm von Bismarck said that Seydlitz had taken over some of the faults and habits of his early patron, the Margrave of Brandenburg-Schwedt, among them "a penchant for gallantry towards the ladies, and his excessive smoking of tobacco" (der Hang zur Galanterie gegen die Damen, und sein übermäßiges Tabackrauchen). The court chamberlain Lehndorff, who met him in Leipzig in November 1757 while Seydlitz was recovering from a wound in the arm, called him "a very decent man, who readily does anyone a service and speaks of his promotion with the greatest modesty"; Seydlitz was lodging with "a very beautiful woman named Semisch", who was "extraordinarily attentive to her patient", and Lehndorff joked that he hoped the matter would end as in Homer's time, "when the heroes, after their recovery, married their hostess". In January 1760 he wrote that Seydlitz was "a handsome man and, what matters more, a man of honour … Women run after him, but he seems to devote himself entirely to Minerva" (Die Frauen laufen ihm nach, aber er scheint sich ganz Minerva zu widmen).

In a letter to Prince Henry of May 1773, Frederick called Seydlitz "a thoroughly honest man" (très-honnête homme), whom he would not exchange for the Austrian general Lacy, adding that Seydlitz knew more about cavalry than Lacy would learn in his whole life.

== Memorials ==
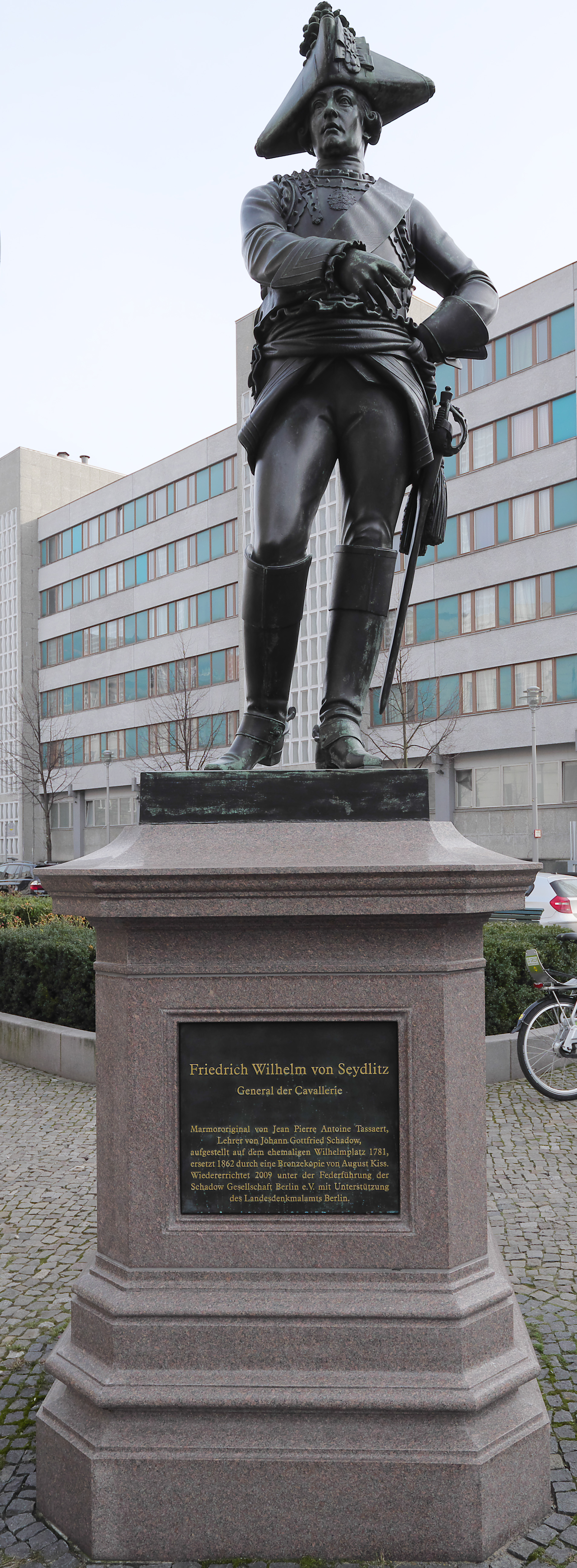
Statue of Seydlitz at Wilhelmplatz in Berlin in 2018

After his death his body lay in state at Ohlau for twenty-four hours in a room hung with black cloth. He was dressed in full uniform, with boots and spurs, sword and sash, in an open coffin covered with crimson velvet and trimmed with silver braid, surrounded by twenty-four white wax candles. On the day of the funeral, 12 November 1773, Lieutenant von Roeder of his regiment gave an address at the open coffin. The coffin was then closed; his hat, cuirass, sash, sword, star and spurs were fastened to it, and eighteen non-commissioned officers lifted it onto the hearse to the sound of muffled trumpets and kettledrums and the ringing of all the bells. Led by nine cannon and three squadrons of his cuirassiers, the procession crossed the bridge over the Oder and halted beyond it, where three salvoes were fired from the cannon and three from small arms. The body was then taken to his estate at Minkowsky, three German miles from Ohlau, where it was received by the estate servants and the villagers and, in accordance with his wishes, laid in a vault built in a hermitage in his garden. According to the account of the funeral, the twelve old cuirassiers who lowered the coffin wept and still called him their father and hero.

The Personalien read on the day of the funeral record that the King had ordered all staff officers of the Silesian cavalry Seydlitz had commanded, and those of the Garde du Corps, the Gens d'armes and the Zieten Hussars, to wear mourning crape on their arms for fourteen days, an honour which, they say, the King had paid to no other commander. Writing to Frederick on 14 November 1773, Prince Henry said that he had been convinced of "the uprightness of his character" (la droiture de son caractère), and called the mourning worn for him by the cavalry an honour to his memory.

According to Buxbaum, the grave still had no monument in 1774; at the King's command, Seydlitz's daughters had one built in a corner of the garden. On its long side, facing the garden, a tablet of black marble bore in gold letters the inscription Herois Fried. Wilh. L. B. de Seydlitz Nat. A. MDCCXXI. Denat. A. MDCCLXXIII. Cineres ("The remains of the hero Friedrich Wilhelm, Freiherr von Seydlitz, born 1721, died 1773"). A laurel wreath and an oak wreath were carved in relief on the short sides; on top stood a large black marble urn, with a white marble lion lying before it. After the battle of Jena in 1806, French soldiers broke open the grave and took the buttons from his uniform. The inscription tablet was destroyed by a mob in 1848 and restored by the owners of the estate in 1849, and in 1857 Count von Wartensleben had a new enclosure built around the grave.

In 1851, Frederick William IV, Frederick's great-great-nephew, included Seydlitz's name on the Equestrian statue of Frederick the Great in Berlin, honoring those who had helped to build the Prussian state. Seydlitz holds a position of honor as one of the four full-sized mounted figures, sharing the first tier of the plinth with the king's brother, his cousin, and Hans Joachim von Zieten. A bronze sculpture installed at Wilhelmplatz, in Berlin, was created by Anton Lulvès, a copper worker from Hamburg. SMS Seydlitz, representing the first generation of battlecruisers, was ordered in 1910 and commissioned in May 1913, the fourth such vessel built for the Imperial German Navy's High Seas Fleet. The heavy cruiser Seydlitz, of the Admiral Hipper class, was launched in 1939, but never completed.

== Bibliography ==
- Van der Aa, Abraham Jacob (1862). "Frederik Sirtema van Grovestins". Biographisch woordenboek der Nederlanden. Deel 7 (in Dutch).
- Bismarck, Friedrich Wilhelm von (1828). General der Reuterei Friedrich Wilhelm von Seydlitz. Reuter-Bibliothek (in German). Vol. 4. Karlsruhe: Chr. Fr. Müller.
- Blankenburg, Christian Friedrich von (1797). Charakter und Lebensgeschichte des Herrn von Seydlitz, Preußischen Generals der Kavallerie (in German). Leipzig: Georg Joachim Göschen.
- Bodart, Gaston (1908). Militär-historisches kreigs-lexikon, (1618–1905) (in German). Stern. OCLC 557473653.
- Buxbaum, Emil (1882). Friedrich Wilhelm von Seydlitz, Königl. Preußischer General der Cavallerie. Der Deutschen Reiterei gewidmet von einem deutschen Reiteroffizier (in German). Kassel.
- Denkmal König Friedrichs des Grossen: enthüllt am 31. Mai 1851 (in German). Verlag der Deckerschen Geheimen Ober-Hofbuchdruckerei. 1851.
- Duffy, Christopher (1986). The Military Life of Frederick the Great. Antheneum. ISBN 978-1-1389-2472-7.
- Frederick II of Prussia (1855). Preuss, Johann David Erdmann (ed.). Œuvres de Frédéric le Grand (in French). Vol. 26. Berlin: Imprimerie royale (R. Decker).
- Genealogischer Militairischer Calender auf das Jahr 1787 (in German). Berlin. 1787.
- Gröner, Erich (1990). German Warships: 1815–1945. Annapolis: Naval Institute Press. ISBN 978-0-87021-790-6.
- "Erläuterung der Kupfer". Historisch-genealogischer Kalender auf das Gemein-Jahr 1789 (in German). Berlin: Königliche Akademie der Wissenschaften. 1789 – via Universitäts- und Landesbibliothek Düsseldorf.
- Jarymowycz, Roman (2009). Cavalry from Hoof to Track. Stackpole Books. ISBN 978-0-8117-5093-6.
- Kaltenborn, Rudolph Wilhelm von (1790). Briefe eines alten Preussischen Officiers, verschiedene Characterzüge Friedrichs des Einzigen betreffend. Mit Rücksicht auf das Zimmermannsche Werk über eben diesen Gegenstand (in German). Vol. 1. Hohenzollern [i.e. Braunschweig]: Schulbuchhandlung.
- König, Anton Balthasar (1791). Biographisches Lexikon aller Helden und Militairpersonen, welche sich in Preußischen Diensten berühmt gemacht haben (in German). Vol. 4. Berlin: Arnold Wever – via Münchener DigitalisierungsZentrum.
- Krogt, René & Peter van der. "Statues Hither and Thither: Berlin – Friedrich Wilhelm von Seydlitz".
- Kurtzbach-Seydlitz, Johann Balthasar von, ed. (1776). Sammlung einiger Schriften dem Andenken Sr. Excellenz Herrn Friedrich Willhelm Frey-Herr v. Seydlitz gewidmet (in German).
- Laubert, Manfred (1900). Die Schlacht bei Kunersdorf am 12. August 1759 (in German). Berlin: Ernst Siegfried Mittler und Sohn.
- Lawley, Robert Neville (1852). General Seydlitz: A Military Biography. London: W. Clowes & Sons (printed for private circulation).
- Lehndorff, Ernst Ahasverus Heinrich von (1907). Schmidt-Lötzen, Karl Eduard (ed.). Dreißig Jahre am Hofe Friedrichs des Großen. Aus den Tagebüchern des Reichsgrafen Ernst Ahasverus Heinrich von Lehndorff (in German). Gotha: Friedrich Andreas Perthes.
- Lehndorff, Ernst Ahasverus Heinrich von (1909). Schmidt-Lötzen, Karl Eduard (ed.). "Nachträge zu Dreißig Jahre am Hofe Friedrichs des Großen" (PDF). Mitteilungen der Literarischen Gesellschaft Masovia (in German) (14). Lötzen: 209–325.
- Lehndorff, Ernst Ahasverus Heinrich von (1910). "Nachträge zu „Dreißig Jahre am Hofe Friedrichs des Großen". Aus den Tagebüchern des Reichsgrafen Ernst Ahasverus Heinrich von Lehndorff, Kammerherrn der Königin Elisabeth Christine von Preußen". In Schmidt, Karl Eduard (ed.). Mitteilungen der Literarischen Gesellschaft Masovia (in German). Vol. 15. Lötzen; Königsberg: Thomas & Oppermann (Ferd. Beyer's Buchhandlung). pp. 28–160.
- Lippe-Weißenfeld, Ernst (Graf zur) (1877). "Domhardt, Joh. Friedrich von". In Historischen Kommission bei der Bayerischen Akademie der Wissenschaften (ed.). Allgemeine Deutsche Biographie. Vol. 5. Duncker & Humblot. pp. 325–326.
- Poten, Bernhard von (1891). "Schütz, Hans von". In Historische Commission bei der königl. Akademie der Wissenschaften (ed.). Allgemeine Deutsche Biographie (in German). Vol. 33. Duncker & Humblot. pp. 124–125.
- Poten, Bernhard von (1892). "Seydlitz-Kurtzbach, Friedrich Wilhelm Freiherr von". In Historische Commission bei der königl. Akademie der Wissenschaften (ed.). Allgemeine Deutsche Biographie (in German). Vol. 34. Duncker & Humblot. pp. 94–101.
- Staff, Gary (2006). German Battlecruisers: 1914–1918. Osprey Books. ISBN 978-1-8460-3009-3.
- Varnhagen von Ense, Karl August (1834). Leben des Generals Freiherrn von Seydlitz (in German). Berlin: Duncker und Humblot.
- Warnery, Charles-Emmanuel de (1788). Campagnes de Frédéric II, roi de Prusse, de 1756 à 1762 (in French). Amsterdam.
- Weigley, Russell F. (2004). The Age of Battles: The Quest for Decisive Warfare from Breitenfeld to Waterloo. Indiana University Press. ISBN 978-0-2532-1707-3.

Attribution
