= Hartwig Karl von Wartenberg =

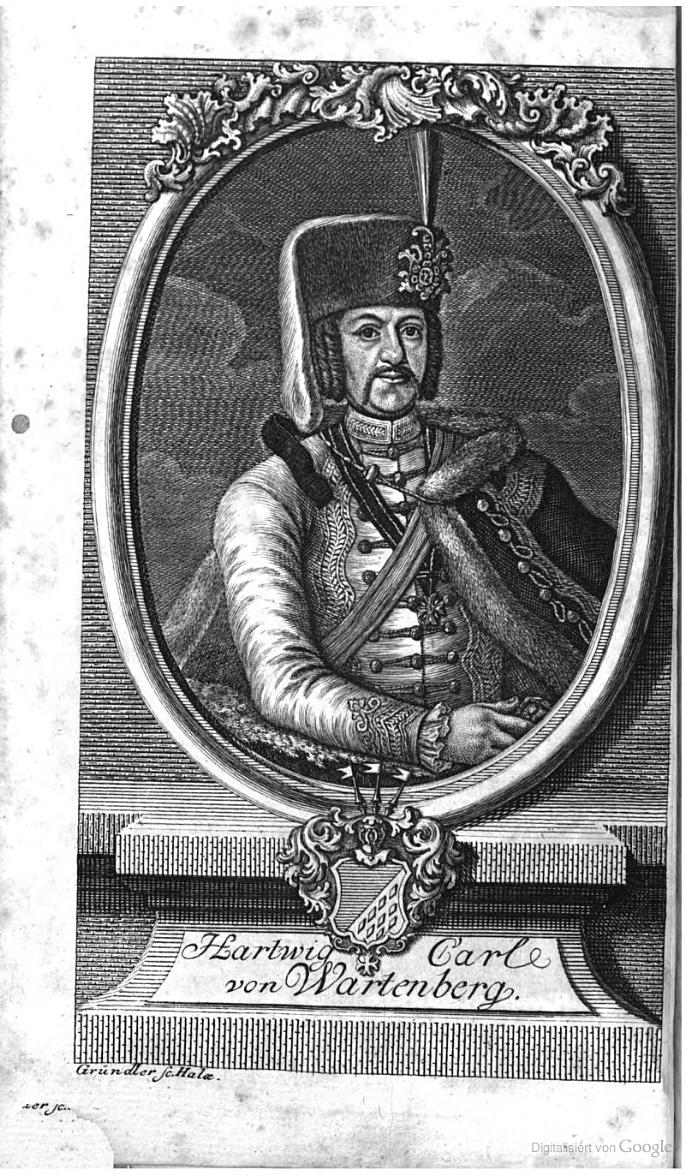
- Born: 3 April 1711; Prignitz
- Died: 2 May 1757 (aged 46); Stará Boleslav
- Military career
- Allegiance: Russian Empire 1731–1740; Kingdom of Prussia 1725–1731; 1740–1757
- Service years: 1725–1757
- Rank: Major general
- Conflicts: War of Austrian Succession; Seven Years' War
- Awards: Pour le Mérite

Hartwig Karl von Wartenberg (3 April 1711 – 2 May 1757) was the Royal Prussian major general and Proprietor (Inhaber) of the Hussars Regiment No. 3.

== Early life ==
Hartwig Karl von Wartenberg was born on 3 April 1711 in Prignitz. He was the son of Rittmeister Alexander Wichart von Wartenberg and Katharina Dorothea von Platen. He was first taught at home and came to the cadet corps in 1726; cadet corps records indicate he was 16 years of age on 16 May 1726. He remained in the cadet corps for five years, five months and was deployed to the king of Prussia's regiment.

Upon his graduation, in 1730 he was in the retinue of Frederick William I (Prussia) at the large military service in Mühlberg. In 1731 he was promoted to the rank of lieutenant, and in the same year he enjoyed the distinction of being allowed to go to Russia with a royal license, in order to assist the Prussian army under Generalfeldmarschall Burkhard Christoph von Münnich. He became a Russian first lieutenant at once and, from 1732 to 1739, he participated in the Russian campaigns against the Poles, Tatars, and Turks.

== Military career ==
Frederick II recalled him on his accession to the throne in 1740 and transferred him as a major to the Natzmer regiment, which had been established in 1740 and became the Hussars Regiment No. 4 in 1742. On 2 March 1741 he was transferred to the Hussars Regiment No. 3 as lieutenant colonel. In 1744 he acquired the Order Pour le Mérite after he helped suppress the insurgency in Silesia at Plesse. Subsequently, he was assigned to the corps of General Ernst Christoph von Nassau. On 5 April 1745, Hyacinth Malachow von Malachowsky, the Proprietor (Inhaber) of the regiment was killed in a skirmish at Gross-Strelitz; he was subsequently promoted to colonel and chief of the Hussars' Regiment No. 3 on 20 April 1745. On 3 September 1751 he was promoted to major general.

He had attained such a reputation that the King ordered some officers of the Brandenburg and the Magdeburg cavalry regiments to join the Hussar Regiment Wartenberg, in order to perfect themselves in the cavalry service. In 1750 he received the Golmenglin estate in Zerbst (today a district of Grimme), which he sold with permission to Count von Melsch. He received the preeminence of the Abbey of Essen, and a sabre richly decorated with stones. In 1755 he bought the estate of Schönfeld from a Count von Pückler.

At the outbreak of the Seven Years' War, in 1756, Wartenberg had with his regiment the advanced guard of the army division of the General Field Marshal Kurt Christoph von Schwerin. This service was also assigned to him and his regiment in 1757, when the army entered Bohemia under Schwerin. On 2 May, he was instructed to secure the bridges and post roads in Stará Boleslav, to keep the Austrians from setting them on fire. With his regiment, and greatly outnumbered, he attacked 1,500 Pandours on the Elbe. In the fighting, he was struck and killed by a musket ball. He was buried in Stará Boleslav. Upon his death, Charles-Emmanuel de Warnery became Proprietor of the regiment.

He had been betrothed to Baroness Rudolphine Wilhelmine Charlotte of Dyhrn (later Countess Henckel) when he died. In his testament, he gave her all his fortune.

Military offices
Preceded by Hyacinth Malachow von Malachowsky	Proprietor of Hussar Regiment Nr. 4; 1745–1757	Succeeded by Charles-Emmanuel de Warnery
