= Friedrich Leopold von Gessler =

Friedrich Leopold Graf von Gessler
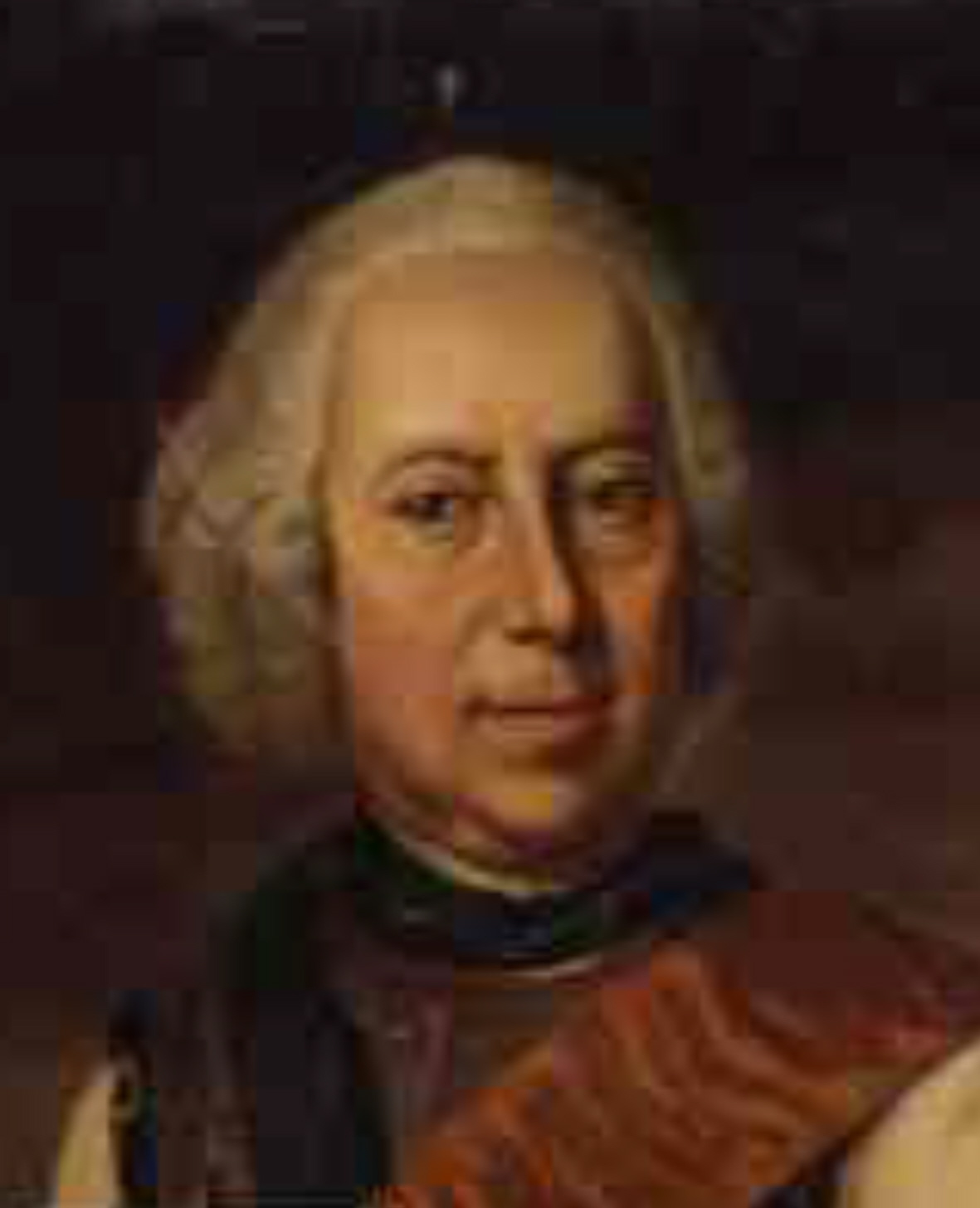
- Born: 24 June 1688; Schwarzenau, Prussia
- Died: 22 August 1762 (aged 74); Brieg
- Military career
- Allegiance: Kingdom of Prussia
- Branch: Prussian Army
- Service years: 1703–1758
- Rank: Generalfeldmarschall
- Conflicts: First Silesian War; Seven Years' War
- Awards: Order of the Black Eagle; Order of Saint John

Friedrich Leopold Graf von Gessler (or Geßler; (24 June 1688 – 22 August 1762) was a Prussian Generalfeldmarschall and one of Frederick the Great's most famous cavalry generals.

== Military career ==
Gessler was born in Schwarzenau (now Gusevsky District) in the Duchy of Prussia. He entered an infantry regiment in Königsberg in 1703, becoming a cadet on 6 June. He fought under Leopold I, Prince of Anhalt-Dessau, in the War of the Spanish Succession. After ten years of service for the Holy Roman Emperors, Gessler returned to the Prussian Army in 1713 as Rittmeister in the Regiment Pannwitz zu Pferde.

On 21 January 1714, Gessler was promoted to major and transferred to a dragoon regiment. Gessler was successively promoted: Oberstleutnant on 1 May 1720; commander of the Regiment Schulenburg Grenadiere zu Pferde on 16 August 1726; oberst on 21 September 1729; commander of the 4th Cuirassier Regiment on 3 May 1733; Generalmajor on 14 July 1739; and Generalleutnant on 17 May 1742.

During the First Silesian War, Gessler distinguished himself at Mollwitz and at Chotusitz, in which he led the cavalry of Wilhelm Dietrich von Buddenbrock's left wing. After the battle, Gessler was promoted to Generalleutnant and awarded the Order of the Black Eagle. In the Battle of Hohenfriedberg, his ride with the Bayreuth Dragoon Regiment, in which 67 standards were captured, became one of the most storied attacks of the Prussian cavalry. In the Battle of Kesselsdorf on 15 December 1745, Gessler led the cavalry of the right wing. Since March 1746, Gessler was stationed with his unit in Neustadt.

Gessler was promoted to General der Kavallerie on 26 May 1747 and to Generalfeldmarschall on 21 December 1751. The last battle he participated in was the Battle of Lobositz on 1 October 1756. He tried to campaign in 1757, but reluctantly retired because of physical ailments on 10 January 1758. In 1851, Frederick William IV included his name on the Equestrian statue of Frederick the Great, among the founders of the modern Prussian state.

The general, who had been admitted to the Order of Saint John in 1735, owned numerous estates in Silesia. Gessler died in Brieg, where he was buried. His tomb, designed by Carl Gotthard Langhans in the Church of St. Nicholas, was completed in 1790.

== Family ==
Gessler was married to Eleonore Gräfin (Baroness) von Stanislawsky-Seeguth, with whom he had twelve children:

- Georg Ludwig Konrad (3 May 1721– 27 July 1761), Militär ∞ Juliane Elisabeth von Liedlau und Ellguth (15 December 1722–7 February 1794) (She remarried again Michael Konstantin von Zaremba)
- Eleonore Margarete Charlotte (19. Juli 1722– 12. Januar 1801) ∞ 24. August 1746 Otto Ludwig von Hirsch (1700–1780)
- Sophie Charlotte (* 1723– 10. January 1776)

∞ Wulf von Natzmer (– 29 March 1759)
∞ Graf Orowsky (– 9. September 1775)

- Wilhelm Leopold (18 December 1724– 8 July 1794), Militär ∞ Karoline von Poppe (–3. Dezember 1786)
- August Bernhard (1 July 1727–17 May 1772), Kriegs- und Domänenrat
- Anna Adelheid (11 July 1729– 22. August 1795) ∞ 1755 Abraham Friedrich von Buddenbrock (* 1702–30 August 1757 in Battle of Gross-Jägersdorf)
- Beate Henriette (* 1730– 4 March 1768)

∞ NN von Keyzen, Hauptmann
∞ 1753 Wilhelm Heinrich von der Tanne (13 February 1710–23 January 1790)

- Frederike Adolphie (1731–?) ∞ 16 July 1757 Hans Kasimir von Schlieben (1714–1788)
- Albertine Luise Gertraud (1719; ?) ∞ Philipp Wilhelm von Grumbkow (23 June 1711–21 September 1776)
- Marie Gottliebe (1734–1754) ∞ Major Leopold von Kleist (29 January 1719–1787)
- Friedrich Sigmund (22 July 1735– 20. Juny 1803), Offizier ∞ Friederike Henriette Franziska von Boyen (21 February 1759–10 April 1820)
- Friedrich (1736–1799)
