= Gaudot Affair =

Gaudot Affair began in 1747, when the King of Prussia, Frederick II, introduced the lease of the tax revenues in Neuchâtel, his principality, to the auction of the rent and tithing, instead of the state administration. In 1766 the opposition to the new system, which conferred considerable advantages to the prince, was published: no one was willing to buy the high-priced tenancies. Frederick II finally proposed the sale of all tithes to the highest bidders, which caused a storm of indignation among the Neuchâtes; they saw in it a disregard for the principle of sovereignty which had been guaranteed to them in 1707, and demanded the restoration of the old system.

In May 1767 Frederick II decided to call the Bernese as arbitrators. Both parties stubbornly defended their position. The representative of the General Prosecutor of the Principality, Claude Gaudot (1713-68), was particularly relentless in his condemnation of Neuchâtel. At the beginning of 1768 the Grand Council of Bern accused Neuchâtel of violating the prince's rights. The rage of the citizens of Neuchâtel was so great that Frederick authorized a Bernese military force to intervene. Although Lucerne, Solothurn, Freiburg, and the ambassador of France attempted to moderate, Bern recruited and gathered 9,000 men to the east of the principality to frightened the citizens of Neuchâtel and Valangins.

Frederick II appointed Gaudot as the representative of the Bernese lieutenant colonel to Neuchâtel. When he returned to the city, he was lynched by the population on 25 April 1768, without the authorities taking the slightest step to protect him. One month later, 600 soldiers from the four allied estates occupied Neuchâtel. The affair ended in August with the complete subjugation of the city.

Robert Scipio von Lentulus was subsequently appointed governor of the city.
