= Nikolaus Andreas von Katzler =

- Born: 11 September 1682; Maastricht
- Died: 10 November 1760 (aged 78); Gardelegen
- Military career
- Allegiance: (Kingdom of Prussia) Prussia
- Branch: Army
- Rank: General
- Conflicts: War of Austrian Succession
- Awards: Order of the Black Eagle; Equestrian Statue of Frederick the Great

Nikolaus Andreas von Katzler (also spelled Katzeler) (11September 1696 – 10 November 1760) was a Prussian lieutenant general.

Von Katzler was born in Maastricht. After joining the Prussian army he was Proprietor of the Gendarme Regiment. He led the left wing of the Prussian cavalry at the Battle of Lobositz in the Seven Years' War and was afterward appointed a knight of the Black Eagle Order by Frederick the Great. Hi son, Georg Ludolf, became a brigadier general.

He was also the heir of the property at Grimminghausen. His name was included in 1851 on the Equestrian statue of Frederick the Great honoring the men considered to be the founders of the modern Prussian state. He died, aged 64, in Gardelegen.
