= Robert Scipio von Lentulus =

Robert Scipio, Freiherr von Lentulus
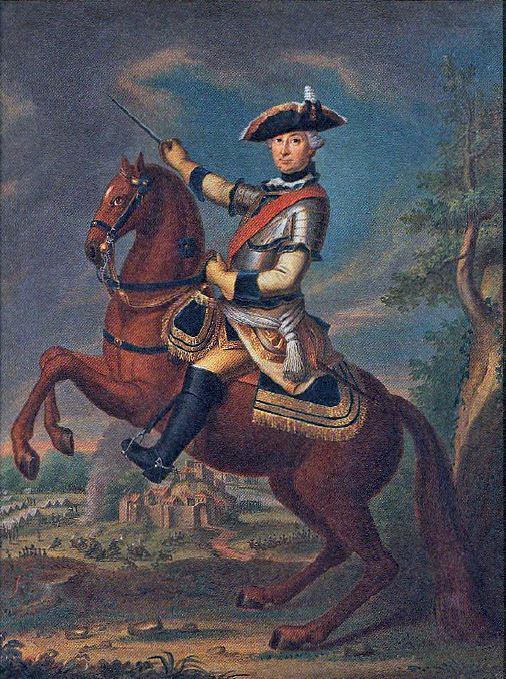
- Born: 19 April 1714; Vienna, Lower Austria
- Died: 26 December 1786 (aged 72); Lausanne, Switzerland
- Burial place: Parc de Mon Repos
- Military career
- Allegiance: (Holy Roman Empire) Austria (Kingdom of Prussia) Prussia
- Branch: Army
- Service years: 1728–1750 (Austria); 1751–1779 (Prussia)
- Rank: Lieutenant General
- Conflicts: War of Polish Succession; Austro-Turkish War (1737–1739); Siege of Niş (1737); War of Austrian Succession; Seven Years' War
- Awards: Order of the Black Eagle; Equestrian statue of Frederick the Great
- Other work: Governor, Neuchâtel 1768–1779

Robert Scipio, Freiherr von Lentulus (18 April 1714 – 26 December 1786) was a military officer, first in Austrian service, later in Prussian service. He was among Frederick the Great's trusted officers, and served him not only in military capacity but as a diplomat and, later, a governor of Neuchâtel. He was proprietor of a Prussian cavalry regiment in the years 1758–1778.

== Early life and Austrian service ==
Robert Scipio, Freiherr von Lentulus, descended from an old Roman noble family (formerly called Linser) that emigrated to the city of Bern in approximately 1592. His father, Caesar Joseph von Lentulus (died 1744) served in the Austrian military and Robert Scipio received his education at the Viennese Jesuit school. He entered the Austrian imperial military in 1728 as a Fähnrich (cadet) in the Dragoon Regiment Philippi.

In the War of Polish Succession Lentulus participated in the 1734 campaign in Italy as the adjutant of the Field marshal, Count Claude Florimond de Mercy, who fell on 28 June in the Battle of San Pietro (sometimes called the Battle of Parma). In 1735, he joined the campaign in the Rhineland. He fought later in the Austro-Turkish War of 1737–39 and from 1742–44 in the campaigns in Bavarian and Bohemia during the War of Austrian Succession. Lentulus was also consulted on military-diplomatic negotiations after the armistice of 1735 and the border regulation between the Banat and Serbia after the Belgrade Peace. When the opportunity arose, Lentulus undertook lengthy journeys in Italy and the Orient.

A decisive factor for Lentulus's further career was his behavior against the Prussian commander, Gottfried Emanuel von Einsiedel, during the Second Silesian War on 16 September 1744. The Austrian commander at Prague, Ferdinand Philipp von Harsch, had agreed to capitulate after a two-week siege. Lentulus, at that time captain, refused to sign the capitulation certificate and, instead, broke his sword: he had been commanded to fight to defend Prague, but not to surrender. This impressed the Prussian King Frederick II so much that he wanted to take Lentulus into his service.

== Prussian service ==
Lentulus initially refused Frederick's request, but left the Austrian army to go to Bern. After the peace settlement of 1745, Prince Leopold I, Prince of Anhalt-Dessau intervened with Lentulus and convinced him to enter the Prussian army. Lentulus entered the Prussian army in 1746 as a cavalry officer with a major's commission. Frederick appointed him as a wing adjutant and revised his officer's patent (commission) to the date of the surrender of Prague. Lentulus married Elisabeth Luise Henriette Auguste Sophie, a daughter of the Minister of State and Count Frederick Albert von Schwerin; upon their marriage Frederick addressed an ode to the couple.

During the Seven Years' War, Lentulus served at the royal headquarters and was sent on several diplomatic missions; and after the Battle of Lobositz, he delivered the victory message to London. He then fought at the Battle of Prague and, subsequently, at the Battle of Kolin. He particularly distinguished himself at the Battle of Rossbach when he pursued the fleeing French army. Subsequently, Lentulus led a brigade formed by the Garde du Corps Cuirassier Regiment Nr. 13 and the Gens d'Armes Cuirassier Regiment Nr. 10. In the Battle of Leuthen, under command of Major General Hans Joachim von Zieten, he again distinguished himself in the attack on the Austrian left flank, and Frederick gave him a reward of a thousand thalers. In 1757, Lentulus was promoted to major general.

In 1758, Lentulus was named proprietor of Leibregiment zu Pferde Cuirassier Regiment Nr. 3, an office that he would hold until 1778. In April 1758, he took part in the Siege of Schweidnitz with seven cuirassier regiments and then moved with Frederick's army to Moravia. In the battles of Zorndorf and Hochkirch, he again led by example. In 1759 he served in Silesia. In 1760, he fought at the head of two dragoon regiments in the Battle of Liegnitz, and commanded the post roads in Silesia in the following winter. The end of his service in this war was, for Lentulus, the Battle of Reichenbach on 16 August 1762.

=== Swiss projects ===
In 1767, Frederick appointed Lentulus lieutenant general, and in 1768, he was appointed governor of Neuchâtel in Switzerland, then under Prussian rule. He was officially governor of the city following the Gaudot Affair, a series of demonstrations against the change in tithing and tenancy regulations. Lentulus gave up the office in 1779.

As during his entire career in Prussia, Lentulus often belonged to the king's closest circles, especially during the years after the war, where he was valued because of his education and intelligence. As early as 1752 Lentulus was present at the wedding of the brother of King, Henry, with the Hessian Princess Wilhelmine. In 1769, Lentulus was present in Neisse at the meeting of Frederick II with Austrian Emperor Joseph II. Following the First Partition of Poland, Frederick sent him to East Prussia in 1773 to take possession of the newly-acquired province and to establish Prussian rule.

In 1778–79, Lentulus took part in the service of Prince Henry during the War of Bavarian Succession, but retired because of his old age. Upon his retirement, Lentulus returned to Bern, where he headed the military system. On the recommendation of Lentulus, the city and the Republic of Bern had already formed the first three Jäger companies in 1768 from good marksmen of the upper regiments.

== Memorials and honors ==
Lentulus died in 1786 on his estate at Parc de Mon Repos near Bern, where his grave is located on the highest point of the Lentulus hill, named after him. Nearby, a street was named after Lentulus.

He was Knight of the Order of the Black Eagle. In 1851, his name was included on the Equestrian statue of Frederick the Great, among the other men who helped to found the modern Prussian state.

Military offices
Preceded by Johann Friedrich von Katte	Proprietor of Cuirassier Regiment Nr. 3; 1758–1778	Succeeded by Johann Rudolf von Merian
