= Battle of Soor =

1745 battle

- Part of the Second Silesian War (War of the Austrian Succession)
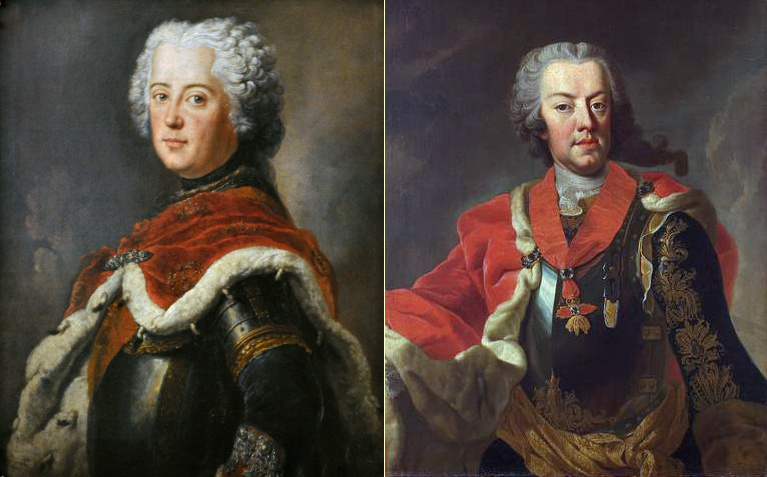
- Frederick and Charles
Date	30 September 1745
Location	Hajnice, Bohemia, modern day Czech Republic 50°30′55″N 15°53′55″E
Result	Prussian victory

Belligerents
Prussia	(Habsburg monarchy) Austria; Saxony

Commanders and leaders
(Kingdom of Prussia) Frederick the Great	(Habsburg monarchy) Charles of Lorraine

Strength
22,500	40,200

Casualties and losses
3,911 killed, wounded or missing	7,444 killed, wounded and missing
- Location within Czech Republic Battle of Soor (Central Europe)

The Battle of Soor (30 September 1745) was a battle between Frederick the Great's Prussian army and an Austro-Saxon army led by Prince Charles Alexander of Lorraine during the Second Silesian War (part of the War of the Austrian Succession). The battle occurred in the vicinity of Soor, also known as Hajnice, in the modern day Czech Republic. The battle started with a failed Austrian surprise attack on the outnumbered Prussians. Despite initial setbacks the Prussian army managed to defeat the Austrians, due to an unexpected attack from a reserve regiment that refused to follow Frederick's orders.

== Background ==
Three months after the battle of Hohenfriedberg, Frederick laid the "Camp of Staudenz", initially planning to return to Berlin, in order to inspect the building work on his new palace of Sans Souci. Having stripped off many detachments during his march through Bohemia, Frederick's numbers had been reduced to 22,500 men. Prince Charles then discovered that Frederick had failed to occupy the Graner-Koppe, a hill north of Burkersdorf (Střítež, Trutnov District, modern day Czech Republic) that dominated the landscape to the east and south. On 29 September, Charles attempted to flank the Prussian camp from the Königreich-Wald hills, and the following morning the Austrians took positions on the crucial Graner-Koppe hill. The 40,200-strong Austrian army intended to destroy the Prussians in a surprise attack.

== Battle ==
Prussian scouts soon detected the Austrian presence, and drummers and trumpeters sounded the general alarm as Prussians began preparing for battle. Austrian artillery proceeded to fire on the Prussian encampment, while the Prussian army marched into battle.

Frederick ordered the cavalry to charge up the valley to the side of the hill in order to encircle the enemy. During the maneuver the cavalry came under artillery fire, suffering heavy casualties. Despite the initial setback the vanguard regiments of the gendarmes and General Buddenbrock's cuirassiers managed to surprise the Austrian cavalry forcing it to flee. Coming under musket fire the Prussian cavalry withdrew to the rear of the force.

By the time of the cavalry retreat, Prussian grenadiers and the Anhalt infantry regiment began engaging the Austrian troops positioned on the hill. An Austrian counterattack, supported by artillery fire, dealt significant damage to the Prussian infantry causing it to fall back. The Prussians then launched a second assault consisting of Geist Grenadiers, Blanckensee, La Motte and other battle hardened regiments. The unwillingness of the Austrian artillery to risk firing at its own troops contributed to the fall of the summit.

A number of Prussian regiments positioned south of Burkersdorf ignored orders to remain in the area and attempted to capture Burkersdorf. A bayonet charge led by Prince Ferdinand of Brunswick seized an Austrian battery, and the surprise attack led to the collapse of the Austrian line. Despite the lack of an organised pursuit many Austrian infantrymen were captured by the Prussian cavalry regiments.

A total of 856 Prussians were killed, while the injured or missing amounted to 3,055. Austrian and Saxon troops suffered 7,444 dead, injured or missing.

== Order of battle ==
=== Austrian – Saxon army order of battle ===
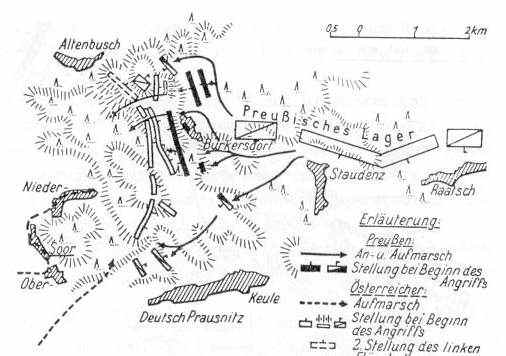
Map of the Battle of Soor

- Right Wing Cavalry Division:
  - Kohary Dragoon Regiment
  - Palffy Cuirassier Regiment
  - Bretlach Cuirassier Regiment
  - Liechtenstein Dragoon Regiment
  - Hohenembs Cuirassier Regiment
  - St. Ignon Cuirassier Regiment
- Right Wing Infantry Division:
  - Hesse – Kassel Infantry Regiment
  - Damnitz Infantry Regiment
  - Baden – Baden Infantry Regiment
  - Kolowrat Infantry Regiment
  - J. Harrach Infantry Regiment
  - Niepperg Infantry Regiment
  - Waldeck Infantry Regiment
  - L.Daun Infantry Regiment
  - Grunne Infantry Regiment
  - Platz Infantry Regiment
  - Landlau Infantry Regiment
  - Croatian Battalion
- Center Infantry Division:
  - Marschal von Biberstein Infantry Regiment
  - Braunschweig – Wolfenbu"ttel Infantry Regiment
  - Bayreuth Infantry Regiment
  - Kokomesde de Vettes Infantry Regiment
  - Botta de Adorna Infantry Regiment
  - 3 Imperial Infantry Regiments
  - S. Guylay Infantry Regiment
  - U.Browne Infantry Regiment
- Left Infantry Division:
  - Kaiser Infantry Regiment
  - Karl von Lothringen Infantry Regiment
  - Livingstein Infantry Regiment
  - Wurmbrand Infantry Regiment
  - J. Harrach Infantry Regiment
  - 3 Grenadier Battalions
  - Converged Elite Company Regiment
- Left Wing Cavalry Division:
  - Bernes Cuirassier Regiment
  - Serbelloni Cuirassier Regiment

=== Prussian army order of battle ===
- Left Wing Cavalry Division:
  - Alt-Wurttemberg Dragoon Regiment
  - Gessler Cuirassier Regiment
  - Rochow Cuirassier Regiment
  - Bornstedt Cuirassier Regiment
- Left Wing Infantry Division:
  - Grumbkow Grenadier Battalion (7/23)
  - Stangen Grenadier Battalion (34/Garrison #5)
  - Retzow Grenadier Garde Battalion
  - I/Leibgarde Infantry Regiment
  - Markgraf Karl Infantry Regiment
  - Dohna Infantry Regiment
  - Lehwaldt Infantry Regiment
  - Kalckstein Infantry Regiment
- Right Wing Infantry Division:
  - Anhalt Infantry Regiment
  - Finck Grenadier Battalion (43/Garrison #2)
  - Tresckow Grenadier Battalion (35/39)
  - Wedel Grenadier Battalion (15/18)
  - Hagen Infantry Regiment
  - Blanckensee Infantry Regiment
  - La Motte Infantry Regiment
- Right Wing Cavalry Division
  - Buddenbrock Cuirassier Regiment
  - Gendarmes Regiment
  - Kyau Cuirassier Regiment
  - Prinz von Preussen Cuirassier Regiment
  - Rothenberg Dragoon Regiment
  - Garde du Corps

== Archaeology ==
In 2025, during construction of the D11 motorway, archaeologists discovered a mass grave from the Battle of Soor near the village of Střítež. There were 12 individuals in the grave, some with gunshot wounds to the head. Bullets, buttons, and personal items were also found. It is unclear whether the remains are Austrian or Prussian.
