= Karl Friedrich von Moller =

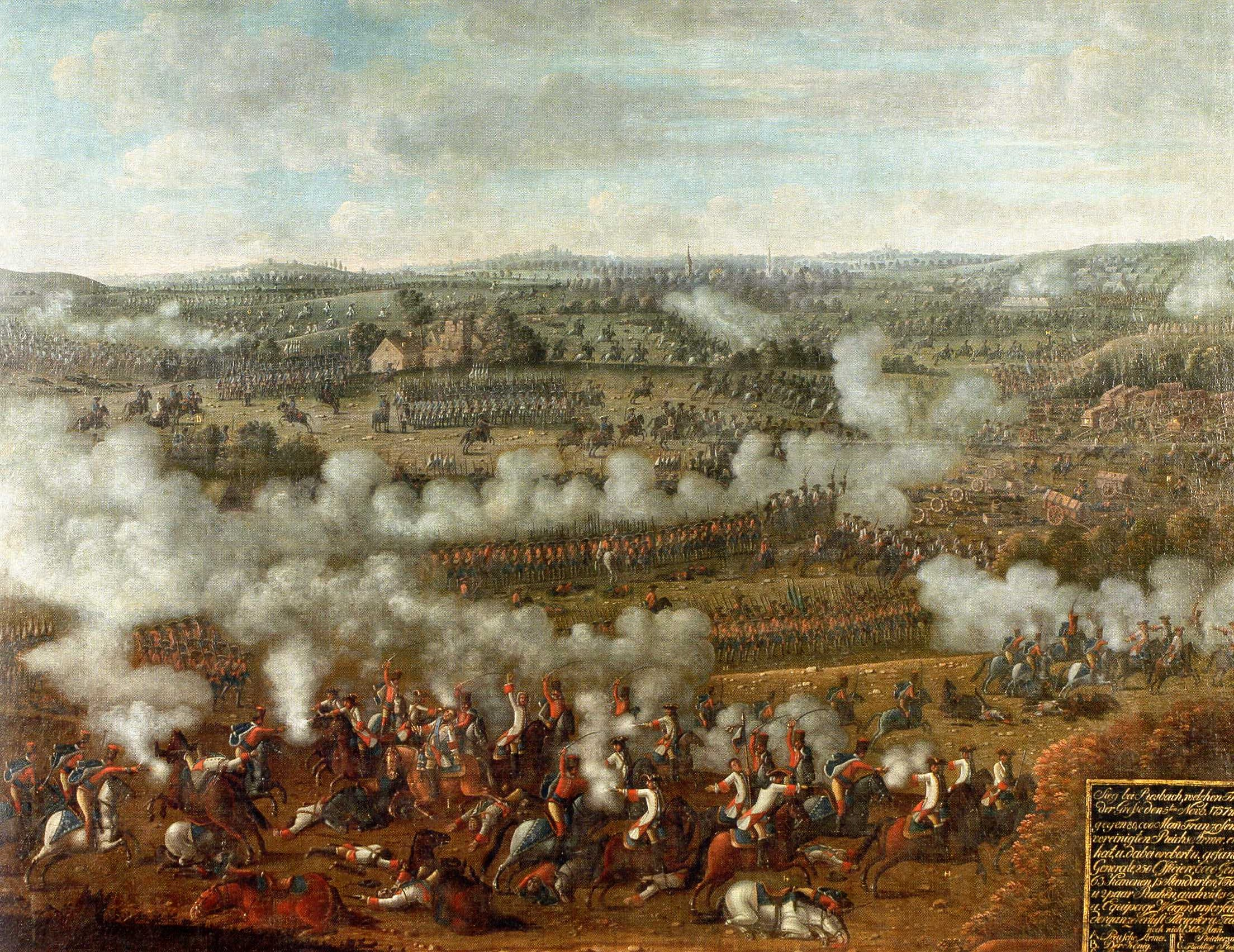
- Lieutenant Colonel von Moller was instrumental in the Prussian victory at Rossbach
- Born: 1690
- Died: 9 November 1762 (aged 71–72) Freiberg, Electorate of Saxony
- Allegiance: Kingdom of Prussia
- Branch: Prussian Army
- Service years: 1720–1762
- Rank: Lieutenant Colonel, Artillery
- Conflicts: War of the Austrian Succession; Seven Years' War
- Awards: Pour le Mérite; Name inscribed on Frederick the Great's Equestrian Statue

Karl Friedrich von Moller (sometimes spelled Möller) (1690 – 9 November 1762) was a Prussian colonel of artillery. His uncanny genius at setting up artillery parks gave Frederick the Great high confidence in the artillery's ability to effect the outcome. During the Seven Years' War, Moller gained great fame specifically for his actions at Lobositz, Rossbach and Zorndorf.

== Military service ==
Moller, born in 1690, joined the Prussian military on 26 January 1720 as a cannoneer in the artillery corps, of which his father was the regimental quartermaster. On 1 April 1729, he was promoted to second lieutenant and on 31 August 1733, to first lieutenant. In 1737, he was dispatched to the Austrian army, to fight in the war against the Ottoman Empire. On 19 November 1741 he returned to the Prussian army, and was promoted to staff captain; in January 1742, he was promoted to captain and on 20 April 1755 to major.

=== Battle of Lobositz ===
The Battle of Lobositz, fought on 1 October 1756, was the first major battle of the Seven Years' War; the artillery played a significant role. The guns started firing at about 6:00 am, but it was occasional fire: after 7:00 am, the artillery put forth a sustained and effective effort. Although the Austrians held the higher ground as far as the infantry and cavalry were concerned, and the artillery thundered from the heights above the Prussian line so long and so loudly that even seasoned veterans became unnerved: some of the Croats in Maximilian Ulysses Reichsgraf von Browne's army fled to the rear of the field and even Browne himself, a life-long veteran, admitted to never hearing anything like it. From 1:00 pm onward, the Prussian howitzers pounded against the Austrian force so effectively the artillery used its ammunition at a rapid rate. The battle was not an unqualified success, although the Austrians abandoned the field which, in the 18th century, was tantamount to admitting defeat. Moller was promoted to lieutenant colonel the day after the battle, 2 October 1756, and received the Order Pour le Mérite. Frederick wrote to Field Marshal Kurt Christoph Graf von Schwerin: "Moller has done miracles and secunded me in an astonishing manner."

=== Battle of Rossbach ===
At the Battle of Rossbach, the center of action occurred around Moller's battery of 16 heavy guns and two howitzers on the Janushügel. Prince Henry's center, composed of infantry, had marched behind the Janus hill, and was supported by Seydlitz's seven regiments of horse. At about 3:00 pm, on the signal from Seydlitz himself, Moller's artillery opened fire on the Allied troops and tore huge gaps in their lines. The artillery first destroyed any semblance of order among the Allied cavalry, and then raked the infantry. The artillery fire was so thorough the concussion of the bombardment could be felt several miles away. Soubise and his staff thought the Prussians were retreating, and using the guns as cover, and simply hurried to get out of range, but this further disorganized the Allied lines, and caused unit cohesion to break down. Consequently, at 3:30 pm, when Seydlitz's squadrons descended on the Allied army, they wrought havoc among the infantry and cavalry who had remained in columns; those who escaped the artillery and the horsemen ran headlong into Prince Henry's infantry. Again, artillery fire came into focus: Moller's battery on the Janus had been reinforced with three siege guns from Leipzig, and these huge guns battered the Austrians again. Rossbach proved that the column as a means of tactical deployment on battlefield was inferior to the Prussian battle line; the massed columns simply could not hold in the face of Moller's fire; the greater the formation of men, the greater the loss of life and limb.

=== Battle of Zorndorf ===
Moller also was present at Prague, Olomouc and Zorndorf. There, at Zorndorf, Moller's artillery was a key to the battle plan. Frederick's plan of attack was first to hammer the Russian right with heavy artillery fire and then to launch Heinrich von Manteuffel's advanced guard against it. Expecting cavalry, the Russians formed in a square, the best way to receive a mounted attack but the worst way to receive an artillery barrage. Moller opened fire with 60 total of his 18- and 24-pounders, placed in two locations around Zorndorf; the initial range was too far, so they closed about 600 paces, and then ripped the Russian squares apart. Russian sources reported that one particular cannon shot killed or wounded 48 grenadiers. Despite this accuracy, Moller's contribution at Zorndorf could not be measured in a single stroke, but in his ability to move his horse artillery around the battlefield. At 1:00 pm, they were in one place, firing canister into tightly-packed Russian formations; at 4:00 pm, they were another place, pounding the Russian line; at 7:00, they were elsewhere, preventing a Russian counter-attack.

=== Last days ===
Frederick held Moller in high regard. Moller once told the King, "Your Majesty, all will be well, my genius will tell me", and the outcome had justified his confidence; Frederick frequently asked him in times of trouble, "what [did] his genius tell him". Moller died in Freiberg, Saxony, on 9 November 1762.

Of the military men whose names are listed on the Equestrian statue of Frederick the Great, Moller is one of only three who did not achieve the rank of general.

His nephew, Christian Friedrich August von Moller (1734–1802), was a lieutenant general.

== Sources ==
- Denkmal König Friedrichs des Großen: Enthüllt am 31. Mai 1851 [Monument to King Frederick the Great: Revealed on May 31, 1851], Verlag der Deckerschen Geheimen Ober-Hofbuchdruckerei, Berlin, 1851 (Reprint Leipzig 1987).
- Poten, Bernhard von. Moller, Karl Friedrich von, Volume 22 (1885), pp. 127–128 and Moller, Christian Friedrich August v. Volume 22 (1885), p. 123. In Allgemeine Deutsche Biographie, edited by the Historischen Kommission bei der Bayerischen Akademie der Wissenschaften [Historical Commission at the Bavarian Academy of Sciences]
- Redman, Herbert J. Frederick the Great and the Seven Years' War, 1756–1763, McFarland, 2015, ISBN 9780786476695
