= Georg Wilhelm von Driesen =

German lieutenant general

Georg Wilhelm von Driesen (8 June 1700 in Klein-Gilgehnen – 2 November 1758 in Dresden) was a lieutenant general in Frederick the Great's Prussian army and a county commission of Osterrode (Ostróda).

== Biography ==
As a theology student at the age of 17, he was persuaded by King Frederick William I of Prussia to "change careers" and entered the Cadet Corps in Berlin, leaving after nine months as a cuirassier cornet. At the accession of King Frederick II, Driesen was a company commander (since November 27, 1739).
He fought in the War of Austrian Succession and was promoted to major in March 1741, earned the Pour le Mérite after the Battle of Chotusitz, and the rank of lieutenant colonel. He returned from the First Silesian War as a colonel and regimental commander.

He also fought in the Seven Years' War. After the Prussians were defeated at the Battle of Breslau, his regiment joined with Frederick's army at Leuthen, where he participated in the Prussian victory by attacking the left wing of the Austrian force. He subsequently helped to chase the Austrian force back to Bohemia.

Suffering from gout, he sought a cure in Dresden and died there in 1758.
His name can be found on the base of the Equestrian statue of Frederick the Great in Berlin (south side).
