= Parc de Mon Repos =

Public park in Lausanne, Switzerland

Coordinates: 46°31′08″N 6°38′34″E

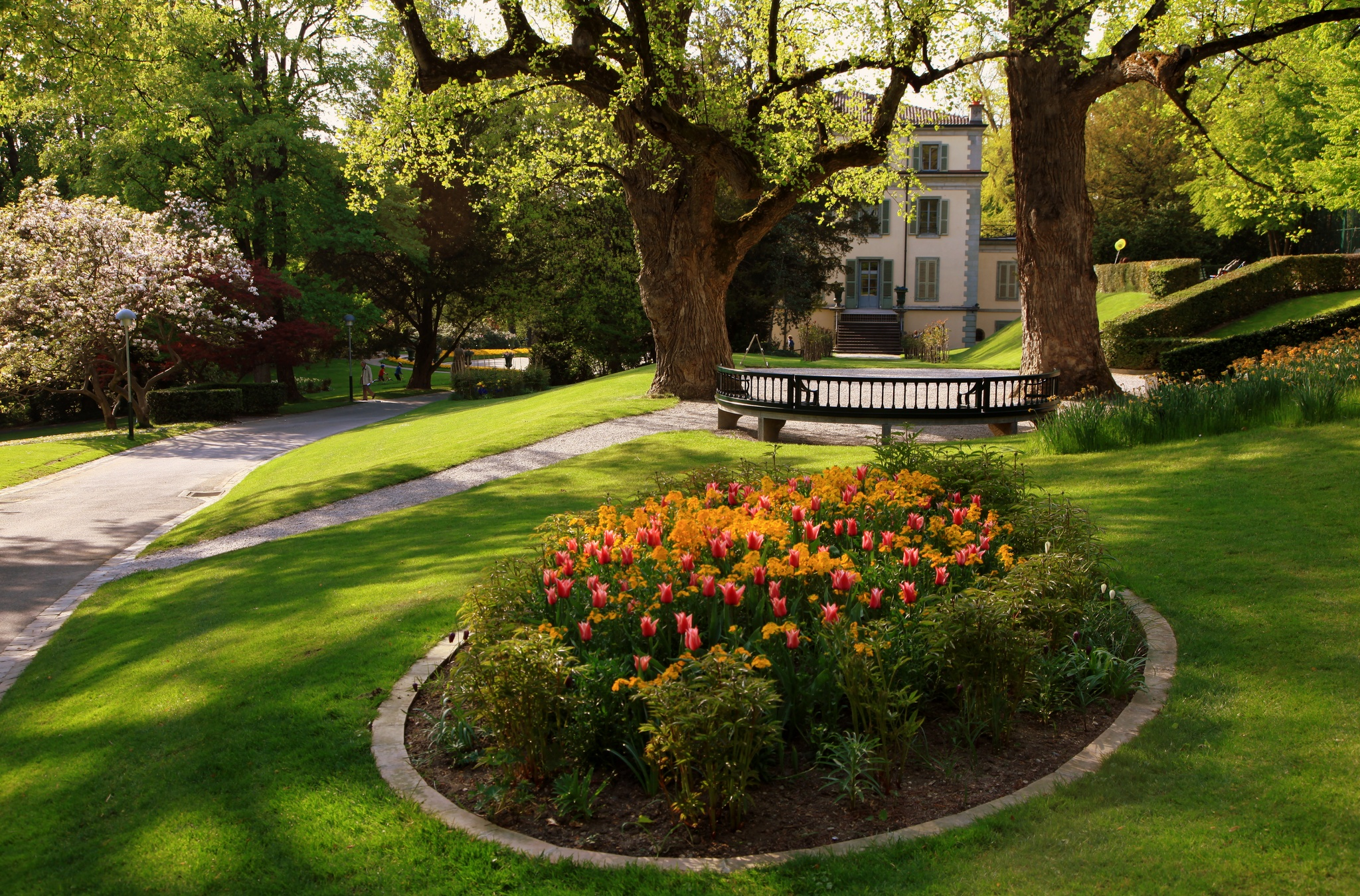

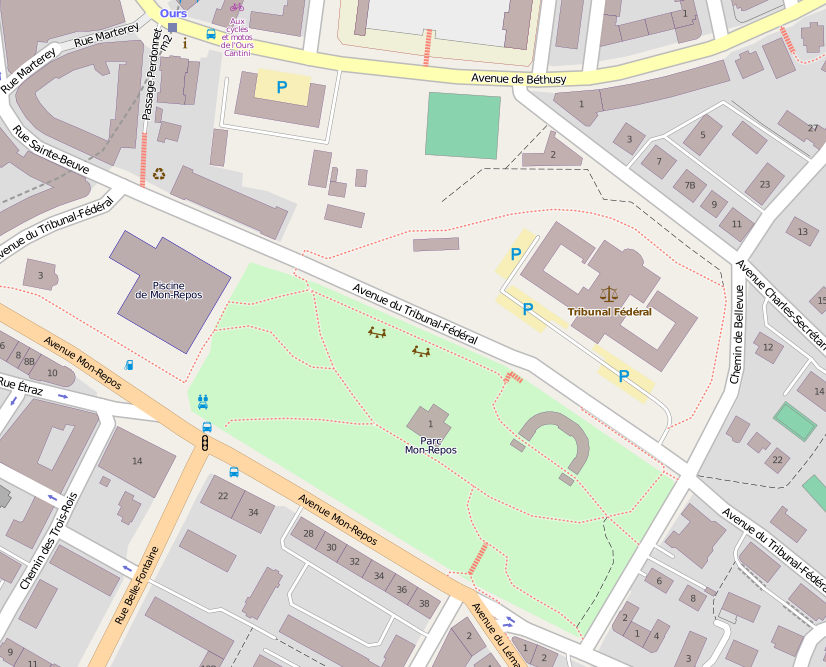
- Type: English landscape garden
- Location: Lausanne, Switzerland
- Website: www.lausanne.ch

The Parc de Mon Repos (French pronunciation: [paʁk d(ə) mɔ̃ ʁ(ə)po]) is a public park of the city of Lausanne, Switzerland.

The villa in the centre of the park hosted the headquarters of the International Olympic Committee from 1922 to 1967.

== Gallery ==
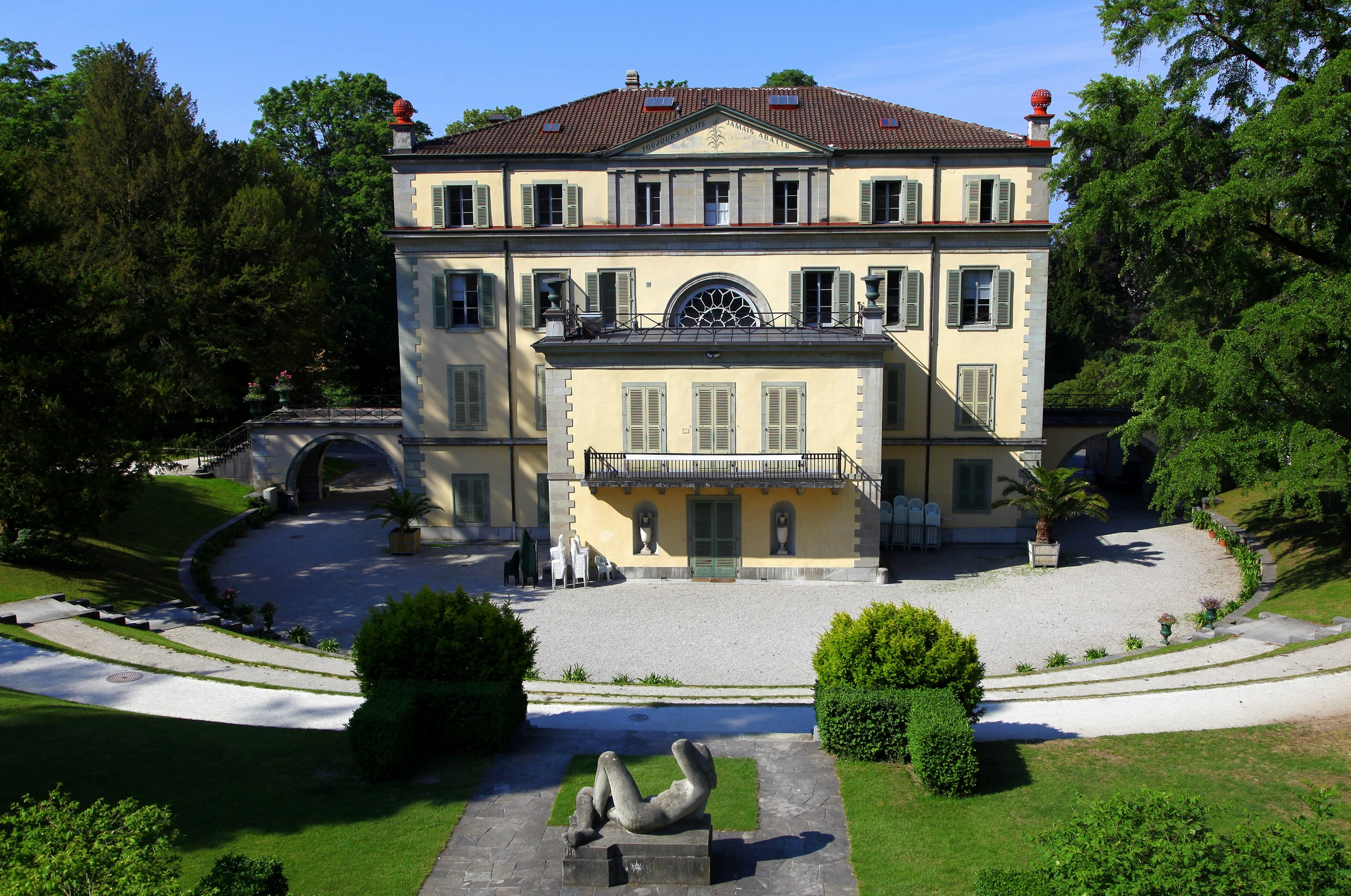
The Maison de Mon-Repos was the headquarters of the International Olympic Committee between 1922 and 1967

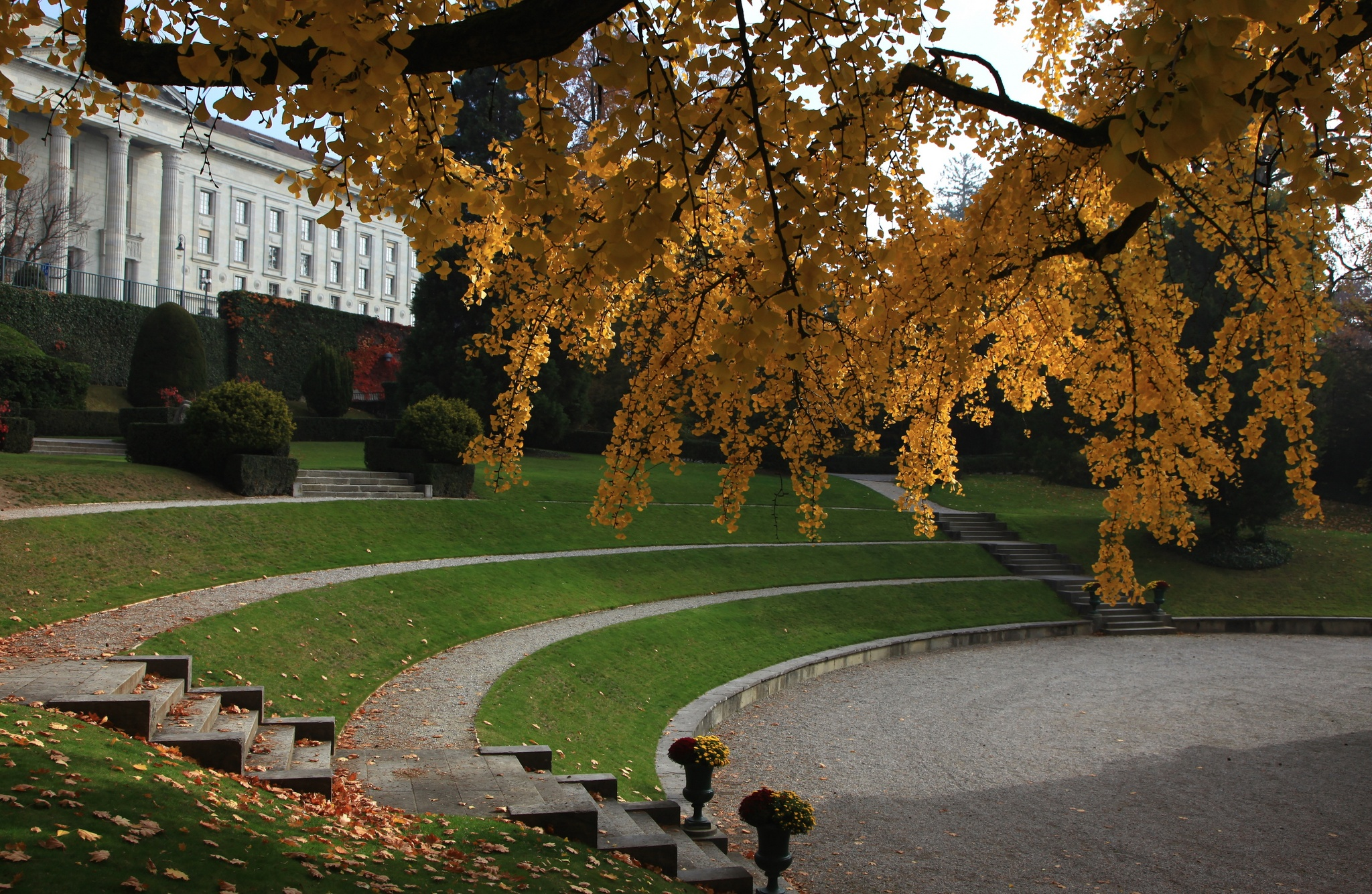
The park and the Federal Supreme Court of Switzerland

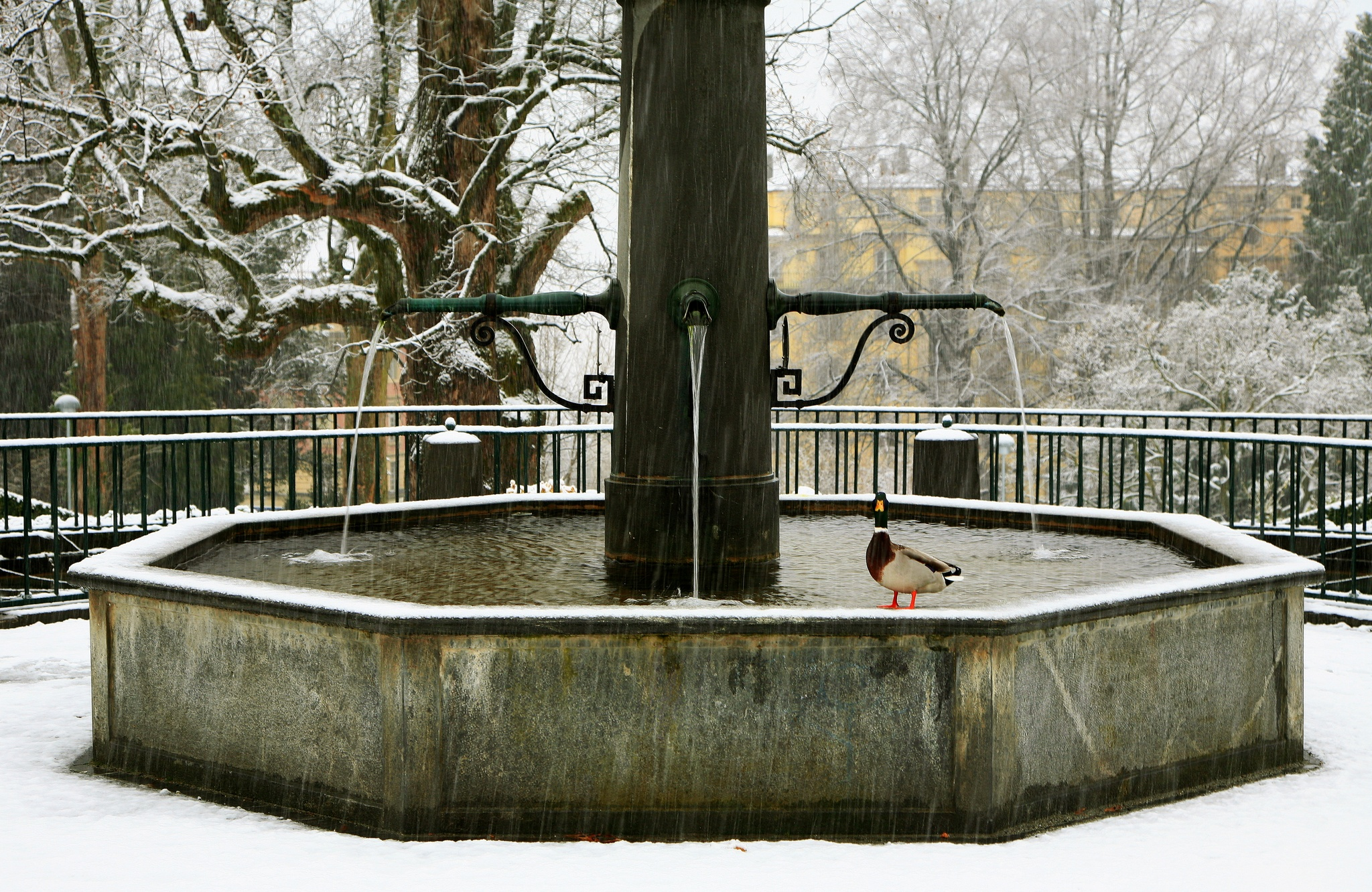
The fountain in front of the former stables

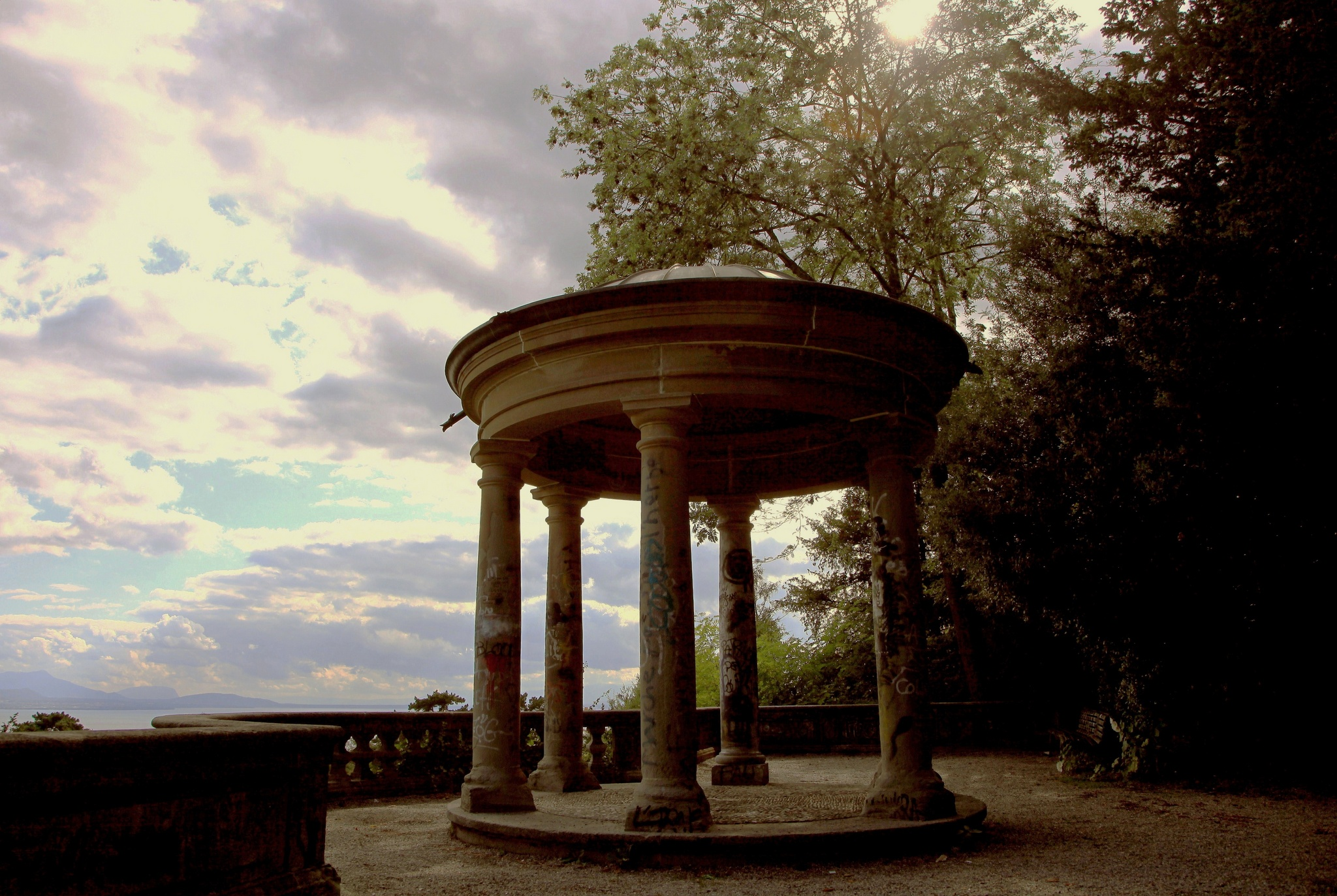
The small neoclassical rotunda

== See also ==
- List of cultural property of national significance in Switzerland: Vaud
