= Hajnice =

- Municipality
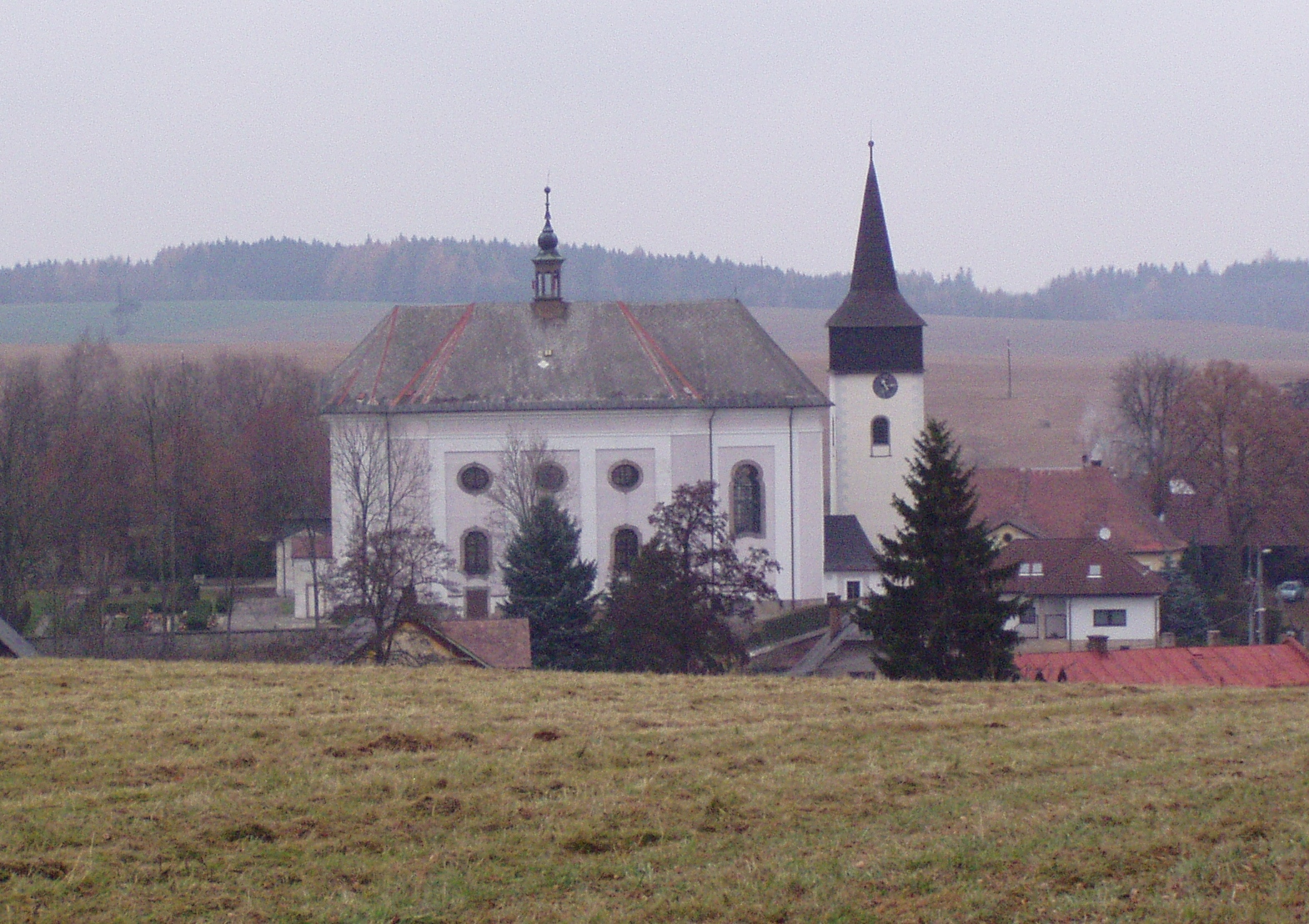
- Church of Saint Nicholas

- Flag Coat of arms

- Location in the Czech Republic
- Coordinates: 50°28′31″N 15°54′45″E
- Country: Czech Republic
- Region: Hradec Králové
- District: Trutnov
- First mentioned: 1260

Area
  - Total: 31.71 km^{2} (12.24 sq mi)
- Elevation: 589 m (1,932 ft)

Population (2026-01-01)
  - Total: 1,071
  - Density: 33.77/km^{2} (87.48/sq mi)
- Time zone: UTC+1 (CET)
  - Summer (DST): UTC+2 (CEST)
- Postal code: 544 66
- Website: www.hajnice.cz

Hajnice (German: Haindorf) is a municipality and village in Trutnov District in the Hradec Králové Region of the Czech Republic. It has about 1,100 inhabitants.

== Administrative division ==
Hajnice consists of three municipal parts (in brackets population according to the 2021 census):

- Hajnice (849)
- Horní Žďár (109)
- Výšinka (60)

== Demographics ==
Historical population
Year	Pop.	±%
1869	3,607	—
1880	3,598	−0.2%
1890	3,341	−7.1%
1900	3,091	−7.5%
1910	2,991	−3.2%
1921	2,546	−14.9%
1930	2,421	−4.9%
1950	994	−58.9%
1961	1,055	+6.1%
1970	963	−8.7%
1980	852	−11.5%
1991	816	−4.2%
2001	880	+7.8%
2011	962	+9.3%
2021	1,018	+5.8%
Source: Censuses
