= Saltz =

Saltz is a surname. Notable people with this surname include:

- Anton Saltz, also known as Anton Yegorovich von Saltza
- Danny Saltz (born 1961), American tennis player
- Gail Saltz, American psychiatrist, psychoanalyst, columnist and television commentator
- Jerry Saltz (born 1951), American art critic
- Lee Saltz (born 1963), American American football player
- Nathan J. Saltz (1912–2003), American-born Israeli doctor
