= Natzmer =

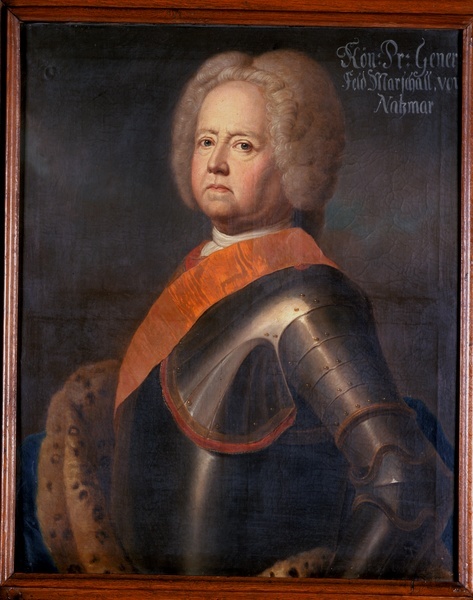
Dubislav Gneomar von Natzmer, Prussian field marshal

The Natzmer family is an old Pomeranian noble family, whose members held significant military positions in the Kingdom of Prussia and later in the German Empire. The family belonged to the German nobility.

== Notable members ==
- Dubislav Gneomar von Natzmer (1654–1739), Prussian field marshal
- Herman von Natzmer (1806–1858), Prussian officer
- Oldwig von Natzmer (1904–1980), German general
- Renate von Natzmer (1898–1935), German spy
