= Battle of Lobositz =

1756 battle in the Seven Years' War

- Part of the Third Silesian War (Seven Years' War)
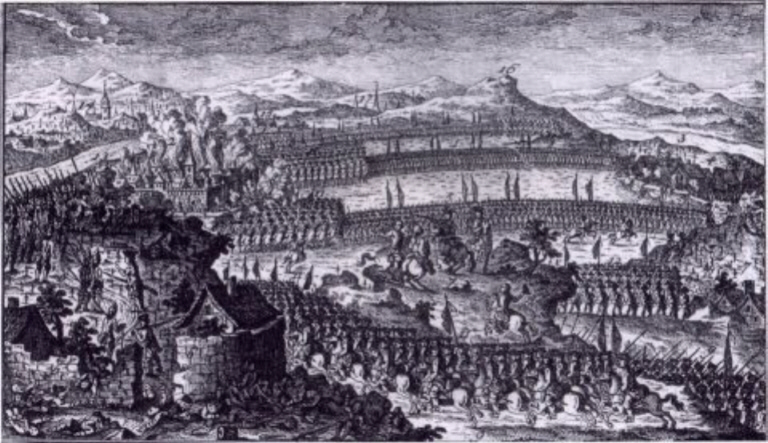
- Lithograph of the battle
Date	1 October 1756
Location	Lovosice, Bohemia, present-day Czech Republic 50°30′46″N 14°02′00″E
Result	See aftermath

Belligerents
(Kingdom of Prussia) Prussia	(Habsburg monarchy) Austria

Commanders and leaders
(Kingdom of Prussia) Frederick the Great	(Holy Roman Empire) Maximilian Ulysses Browne

Strength
28,300 men 98 guns	33,354 men 94 guns

Casualties and losses
2,906–3,300	2,984–3,291

Frederick the Great
current battle
First Silesian War
Second Silesian War
Third Silesian War

The Battle of Lobositz or Lovosice also Lowositz on 1 October 1756 was the opening land battle of the Third Silesian War and the wider Seven Years' War. Frederick the Great's 28,000 Prussians were prevented by 33,000 Austrians under Maximilian Ulysses Count von Browne from continuing their invasion into the rich Bohemian plain, forcing Frederick to ultimately fall back north into Saxony for the winter.

== Prelude ==
Being a believer in the pre-emptive strike, on 29 August 1756 Frederick invaded Saxony with the bulk of the Prussian army, against the advice of his British allies. Neither the Saxon nor the Austrian army was ready for war. The Saxon army took up a strong defensive position near Pirna, and Frederick had no option but to isolate and try to starve them into surrendering. Meanwhile, realizing that the siege would take some time, he was compelled to leave a covering force around Pirna and head south through the rough Mittel-Gebirge of northern Bohemia to establish a winter base in the rich Bohemian plain.

An Austrian army under Field Marshal von Browne had prepared a fortified base at Budin to block any Prussian moves out of the Mittel-Gebirge. Browne had been in secret communication with the Saxon prime minister, Heinrich Count Bruhl, and had planned a rescue mission up the right bank of the Elbe to Königstein, near Pirna, to help the Saxon army escape across the river and join its allies. On the 28th, Browne received an enthusiastic agreement from Bruhl on his proposal; the date of the rendezvous of the two forces was to be the night of 11/12 September.

Meanwhile, Frederick and his 28,000 men were making their way through the Mittel-Gebirge toward the Bohemian plain. Browne's intelligence told him that the Prussians would exit from the mountains at Lobositz, modern day Lovosice in the Czech Republic a few miles northwest of his fortified base at Budin. He recalled his small relief force up the Elbe and raced with 33,000 men up to Lobositz on the 28th to lay an ambush for Frederick as he debouched from the narrow passes of the mountains.

== Battle ==
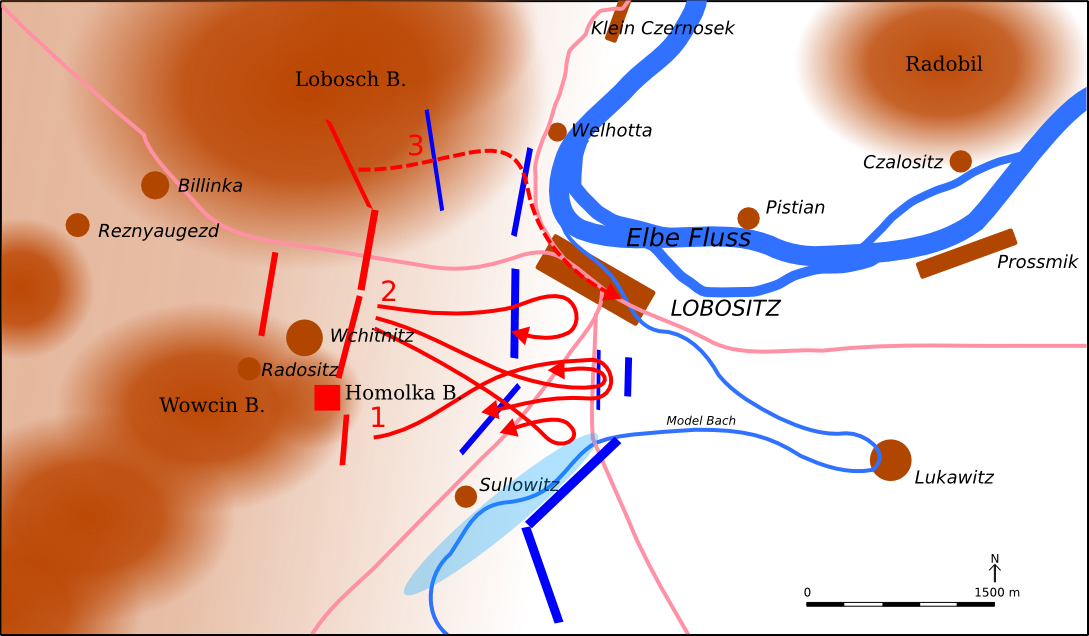
Map of the Battle of Lobositz. Red is Prussian, blue Austrian army.

The Austrian army took up defensive positions on an extinct volcano above Lobositz, the Lobosch, deploying their battalions from Croatia among the walled vineyards that covered the lower flanks of that hill. These, in turn, were supported by 7,800 regular infantry under Franz Moritz von Lacy, hidden from view on the eastern side of the mountain. In front of the town Browne set up a relatively small force of cavalry and grenadier battalions as bait. Behind these, and hidden by a sunken road, he positioned more irregulars and grenadiers in ambush, and behind these he positioned a reserve brigade of cuirassiers. On the south Browne hid the bulk of his army on the other side of a marsh defined by the Morellenbach. He had his battalions lie down in the tall grass and hid his heavy cavalry squadrons behind the woods of a game preserve next to the village of Sullowitz. In this village he also placed some battalions of infantry and artillery. Most of his army was hidden from Prussian view by morning mist and terrain.

On the morning of 1 October, in heavy fog, Frederick's Prussians approached Lobositz in column of route. They were completely unaware that they were walking into a trap. The Austrians irregulars on the Lobosch began to fire at them and Frederick dispatched Duke of Brunswick-Bevern with seven battalions of infantry to brush them off. The center of the Prussian position between the two mountains, the Lobosch to the north and the Ovcin to the south, was dominated by a low spur called the Homolka. The few irregulars defending this were chased away and the Prussians unlimbered a battery of heavy artillery on it. From the Homolka, in the slowly dissolving fog and squinting into the sunrise, it looked to Frederick and his staff as though the plain below them was occupied by only a few cavalry. Their consensus was that Browne was in retreat and had just left this small rear guard.

The Prussian battery on the Homolka began to fire on the scurrying cavalry below them, who had been repeatedly shuffled around by their commanders to make them moving targets. These were composed of a regiment of the Kaiser Franz Dragoons, some combined cavalry of elite companies, and two small regiments of hussars (Hadik and Baranyay).

In the meantime, Frederick's main force of infantry began to deploy into line between the Homolka mound and the Lobosch. They were, in turn, backed by several lines of the main Prussian cavalry force, over 10,000 in all, in the narrow valley behind them; the steep, vine-covered flanks not suitable for the normal 18th century deployment of cavalry on the army's wings.

As the mist lifted, a heretofore hidden battery of Austrian heavy guns in front of Lobositz (12 pounders and howitzers) began to fire on the exposed Prussian infantry. Frederick's artillery commander, Karl Friedrich von Moller, brought up the rest of his own heavy guns and howitzers on the Prussian left to answer this new threat. But for the next few hours, the Prussian infantry (who, apparently and unlike the Austrians, remained standing in close ranks) took heavy casualties.

Anxious to end this and brush away what he thought was an annoying rear guard, Frederick took his staff's advice and ordered a limited cavalry charge down the hill to chase the few Austrians away. Led by Lt. Gen. Kyau, some 1,200 Prussian cuirassiers charged the Austrian horse and drove them back toward the Elbe. Continuing on, however, the Prussian squadrons came upon the unexpected sunken road between Lobositz and the Morellenbach, in which were hidden several hundred irregulars and Austrian grenadiers. The Prussian cuirassiers were also surprised by considerable fire from their right flank by massed batteries of artillery and infantry hidden in the village of Sullowitz. As the surviving Prussian cavalry made their way forward in disorder across the sunken road, assailed on the right and left by the ambush laid for them, they were finally counterattacked by a hidden brigade of 1,300 fresh Austrian cuirassiers (the Cordua and Stampach Regiments under Karel Adam Felix von Lobkowitz) and thrown back. The Prussian troopers retreated with heavy casualties back up the Homolka.

It was suddenly apparent from this surprising setback that Frederick was not facing any mere rear guard but the entire Austrian army, deployed in a strong, flanking position. Moreover, the action on the Prussian left up on the Lobosch mountain was also proving to be much more strongly held than anticipated. Bevern was having no luck in "brushing aside" the irregulars from the vineyards, who had themselves, all morning, been heavily reinforced by Lacy's infantry. But even worse was to come.

Seeing his fellow cavalrymen humiliated and repulsed, General Gessler, Frederick's chief of cavalry, took it upon himself to order a general charge with all his remaining squadrons. Gessler had evidently been stung by a reprimand on his courage by the Prussian King a few days before and was anxious to amend the insult. He was also merely obeying Frederick's standing order to all of his cavalry to never let a check go unanswered, but to always attack on its own initiative. So filtering all of his 7,200 troopers through the Prussian infantry, Gessler led a massive charge down into the floodplain. As he watched this charge unfold, Frederick was said to have exclaimed, "My God, what is my cavalry doing! They're attacking a second time, and nobody gave the order!"

The results were the same as the first charge, but on a larger scale. The Prussian squadrons were raked on their flanks by the hidden Austrian guns and infantry, and counterattacked by the now-reinforced Austrian cavalry. A few Prussian cuirassiers attempted to struggle across the muddy Morellenbach to get at the main Austrian guns but their horses were so blown that they couldn't climb the bank on the far side and were mowed down by the Austrian battalions (now standing up) at the top. In the end, all of Frederick's cavalry were spent and forced to retreat.

As in another of his first battles, Mollwitz, Frederick was convinced at this point that he had lost this one and abandoned the field. In that other battle, too, fifteen years before, it was his cavalry that had let him down. This time he withdrew to the village of Wchinitz behind his front line and left command of the battle to Bevern and Prince Ferdinand of Brunswick.

For his part, Bevern was not so discouraged. His original seven battalions on Lobositz had shot away all of their ammunition without dislodging the irregulars from the vineyards. He grabbed more battalions from the Prussian center and threw them into the fight on the hill. When told by his men, unused to this kind of broken country fighting, that they had run out of ammunition, he was reported to have sneered, "What! Haven't you got bayonets? Skewer the dogs dead!" and led a charge across the slopes. The Austrians and irregulars on Lobosch, too, had run out of ammunition themselves and had also been fighting all day. They started to slowly fall back into the town, defending the gates tenaciously. But the Prussian artillery commander, von Moller, ordered his howitzers to set fire to the town and drive the defenders out. Hundreds of Austrian wounded and even captured Prussian wounded in Lobositz were burned alive in the fire before they could all be gotten out.

It was now about sunset (17:42 at this time of year at this latitude) and both sides, after having fought all day long, stopped firing. Browne brought all of his surviving right wing safely through Lobositz and over the Morellenbach. Both armies went into bivouac for the night. Browne had lost about 2,900 men during the battle. The Prussians, themselves having lost about the same number, had fully expected to have to resume fighting the next day, this time attacking across the formidable marsh of the Morellen. But during the night Browne, having accomplished his immediate objective of stopping Frederick's momentum, ordered his army to fall back to the prepared lines of Budin.

It wasn't until late that night that the rattled Frederick was convinced by Bevern and Brunswick that he hadn't lost this, his first battle of the war. And when, the next morning, he saw that Browne had pulled out during the night, he was greatly relieved. There was a saying going around the army, comparing these enemies to those they had so easily beaten during the previous war, "These are no longer the same old Austrians."

== Aftermath ==
Both sides lost about the same number of men each, about 2,900, which was more severe for the initially smaller Prussian army Frederick, still shaken in the following days, decided his only political option was to proclaim Lobositz as a victory by 18th century rules of combat (since Browne had left the field of battle). However, Browne had done exactly what he had set out to do: stop Frederick at Lobositz and cover his own crossing of the Elbe further upstream to go and rescue the Saxon army at Pirna. Indeed, Frederick, though he sat on the "field of victory", never advanced beyond Lobositz and within two weeks had ordered a general retreat back into Saxony. So, strategically, with his army intact, Bohemia safe, and his way north to the Saxons unhindered, Browne could be thought of as having won a strategic victory at Lobositz.

In the aftermath, Browne did lead his rescue mission north, with a picked force of 8,000 men, down the right (eastern) bank of the Elbe. Though suffering from tuberculosis himself and coughing up blood, Browne drove himself and his men through rain and mountain passes to arrive at his rendezvous point, Königstein, at precisely the date he promised the Saxons, October 11. However, the Saxons had not lived up to their own promise to cross the Elbe at Königstein on that date, and procrastinated. The dissembling Count Bruhl was negotiating with the Prussians for a better deal and kept sending disingenuous pleas for patience to Browne. By the 14th, the Prussians, finally alerted to the presence of the Austrians waiting on the right bank opposite Königstein, had crossed with a blocking force themselves. By then Bruhl and the Saxon King Augustus III, as well as the senior Saxon general staff, surrendered the entire Saxon army to Frederick, and had negotiated some fairly lucrative compensation arrangements for themselves. The Saxon regiments were all incorporated whole into the Prussian army (as IRs 50-59). However, this political-military coup proved short-lived for most of the infantry regiments defected within a year. And the Saxon cavalry regiments took it upon themselves (including Count Bruhl's own chevauleger regiment) to escape and fight intact for the Austrians.

Browne brought his rescue party safely back to his base at Budin, having failed in his mission, but through no fault of his own. By the end of October, the entire Prussian army had retreated out of Bohemia and back across the Elbe to winter in Saxony. So the end of 1756, the first year of the Seven Years' War, ended in a stalemate, but with Austria in a good strategic position for 1757.
