= Equestrian statue of Frederick the Great =

Monumental sculpture in Unter den Linden, Berlin

Coordinates: 52°31′02″N 13°23′34″E

- Reiterstandbild Friedrichs des Großen (German)
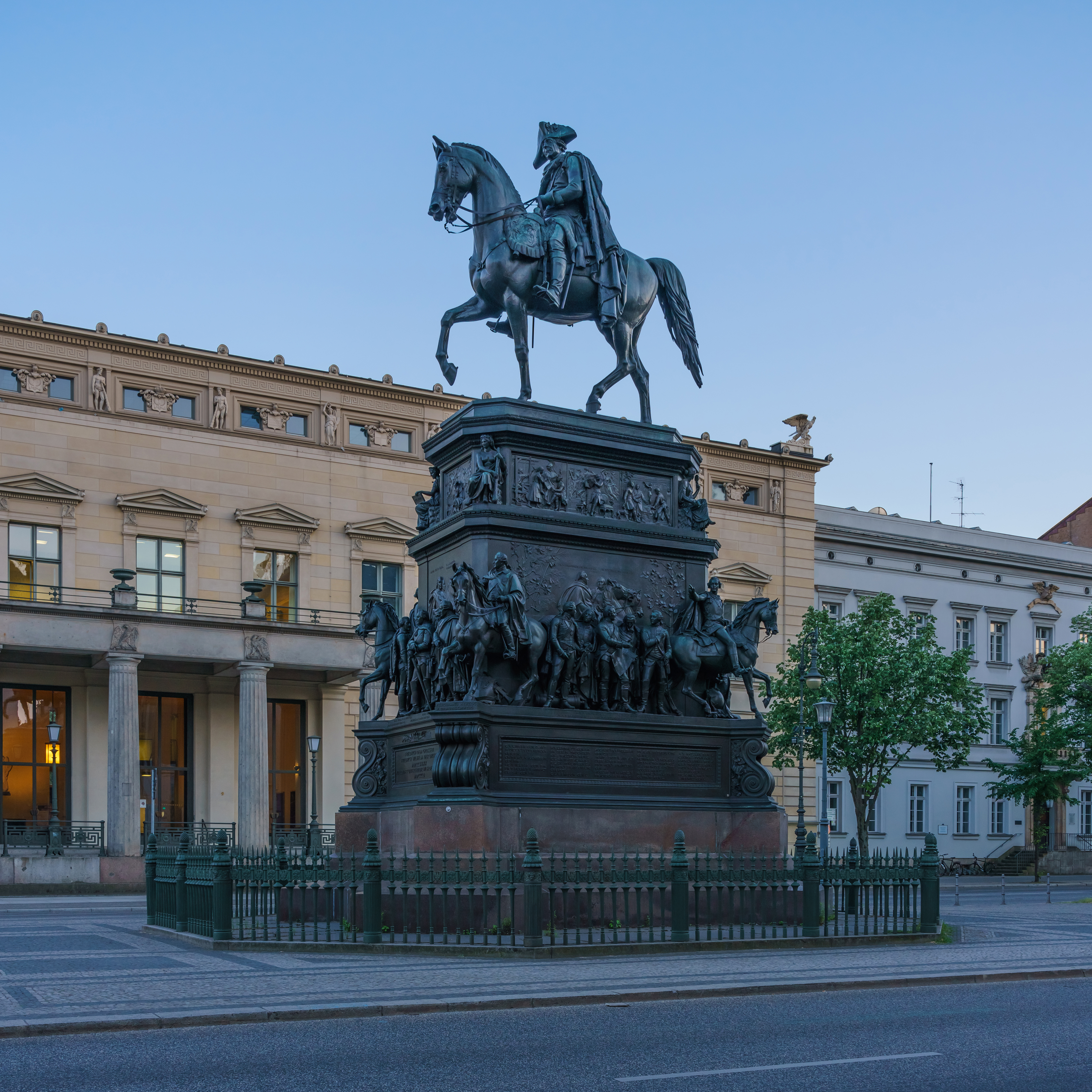
- Artist: Christian Daniel Rauch
- Year: 1851
- Medium: Bronze
- Dimensions: 13.50 m (44.3 ft)
- Location: Unter den Linden, Berlin, Germany

The equestrian statue of Frederick the Great on Unter den Linden avenue in Berlin's Mitte district commemorates King Frederick II of Prussia. Created from 1839 to 1851 by Christian Daniel Rauch, it is a masterpiece of the Berlin school of sculpture, marking the transition from neoclassicism to realism. The bronze statue shows "The Old Fritz" dressed in military uniform, ermine coat and tricorne hat on horseback above the leading generals, statesmen, artists and scientists of his time. Walled in during World War II, it was disassembled by East Germany in 1950, reassembled in Sanssouci Park in 1963, and returned to its original location in 1980.

== History ==
Prussian King Frederick William III commissioned the monument from sculptor Christian Daniel Rauch in 1839. It was cast beginning in 1845 by Karl Ludwig Friebel, whom Rauch brought from Lauchhammer for the purpose; changes to the figures on the base extended work to six years, and the monument was unveiled on 31 May 1851. It is one of Rauch's best known works, and influenced other monuments erected in the late 19th and early 20th centuries.

The equestrian statue influenced many other monuments and is a registered monument of the City of Berlin. Beneath the equestrian statue itself, the unusually large plinth includes reliefs of the four cardinal virtues and important scenes from Frederick's life, and depictions, many in full relief, of 74 notable men from his reign; bronze plaques beneath the bands of sculpture list military men, philosophers, mathematicians, poets, statesmen, engineers, and others important in Prussia's emergence as a great power in the mid-18th century.

During World War II, the monument was encased in concrete for protection. In May 1950, the East Berlin Magistrat decided to remove it to the park at the palace of Sanssouci in Potsdam. Metal thieves damaged it after the protective casing was removed, and it was dismantled and taken away between 13 and 19 July. After being stored in pieces and at one point almost melted down, by 1962 the monument had been re-erected in the hippodrome at Charlottenhof Palace.

In the 1980s, the East German government changed its politics of memory and especially its position on the Prussian heritage. In 1980 Erich Honecker called Frederick "the Great" in an interview with Robert Maxwell; in the same year, the historian Ingrid Mittenzwei published a relatively positive biography of the king. The statue was restored and returned to Unter den Linden, approximately 6 metres (20 ft) east of its old position. West Germany saw a similar return of a more positive view on Prussia with the Berlin exhibition Preußen – Versuch einer Bilanz (Prussia, an attempt at a complete picture). The preparations to celebrate the 750th anniversary of the founding of Berlin in 1987 led to further reconsideration of the Prussian heritage; that year Gisela May performed a song celebrating the statue's return.

After German reunification, the Senate of Berlin had the monument scientifically restored, and it was replaced in its original position, with the wrought-iron fence and 19th-century lamp posts recreated. After having paint thrown at it during a protest against the Bundeswehr, it was restored once more in 2006 and given a coating of wax to protect against graffiti.

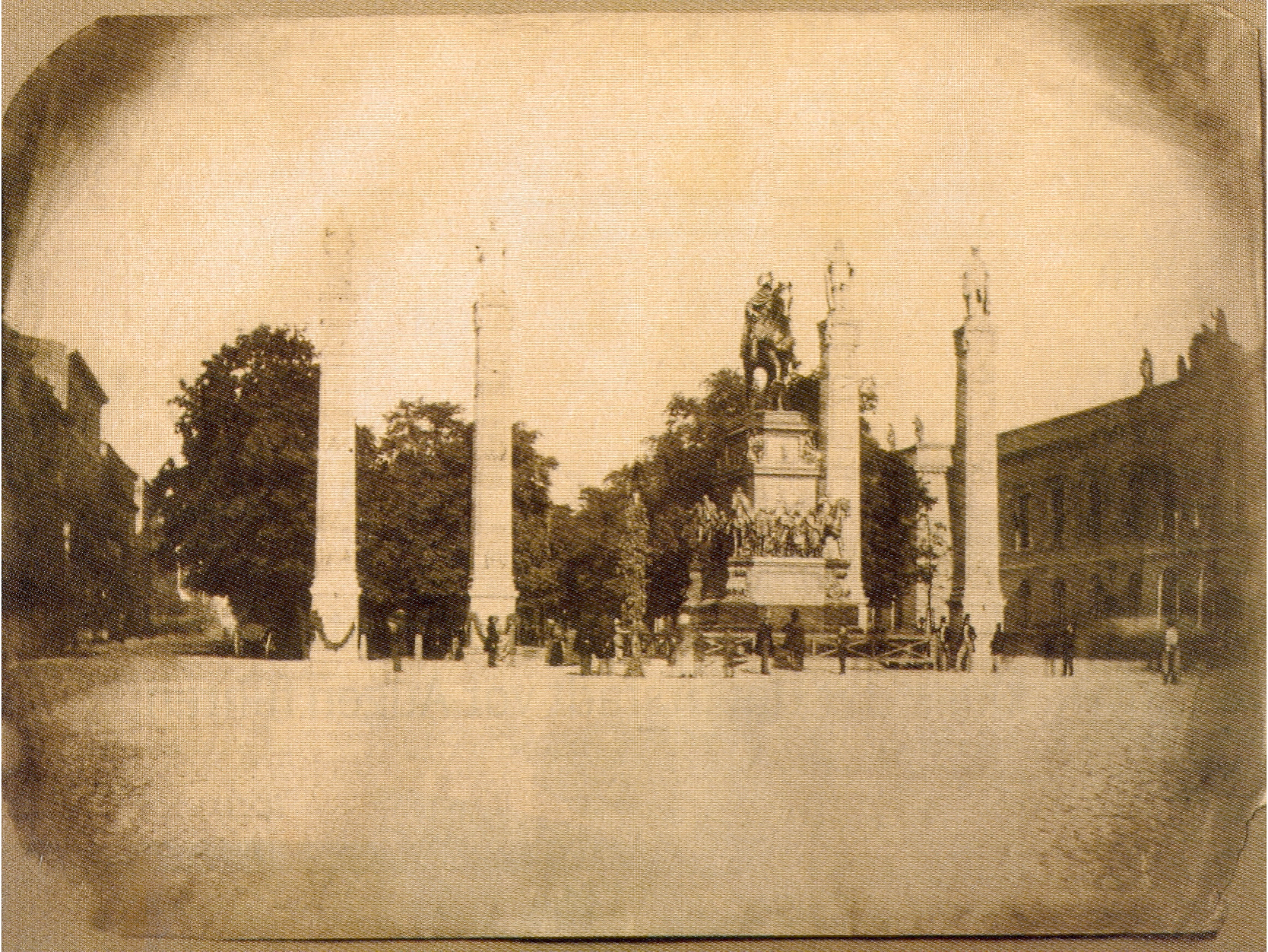
Unveiling of the memorial, 1851

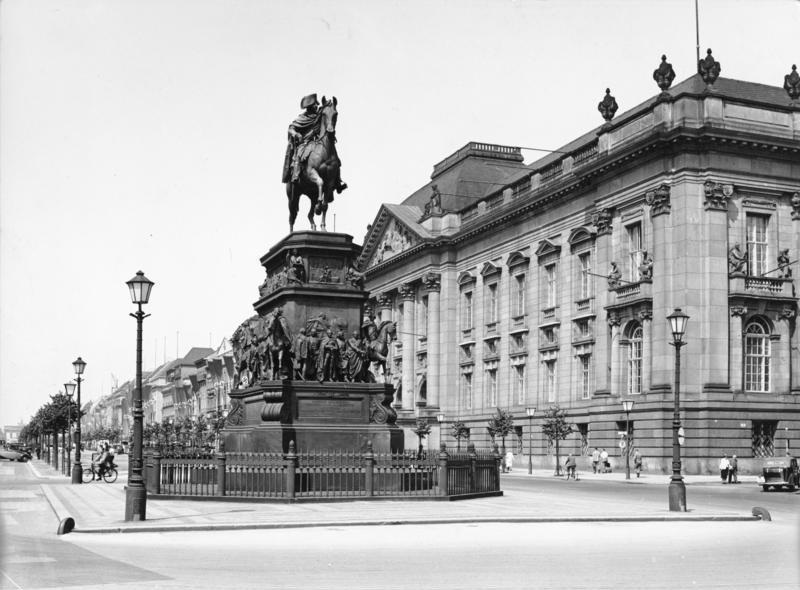
Looking towards the Brandenburg Gate, 1930s

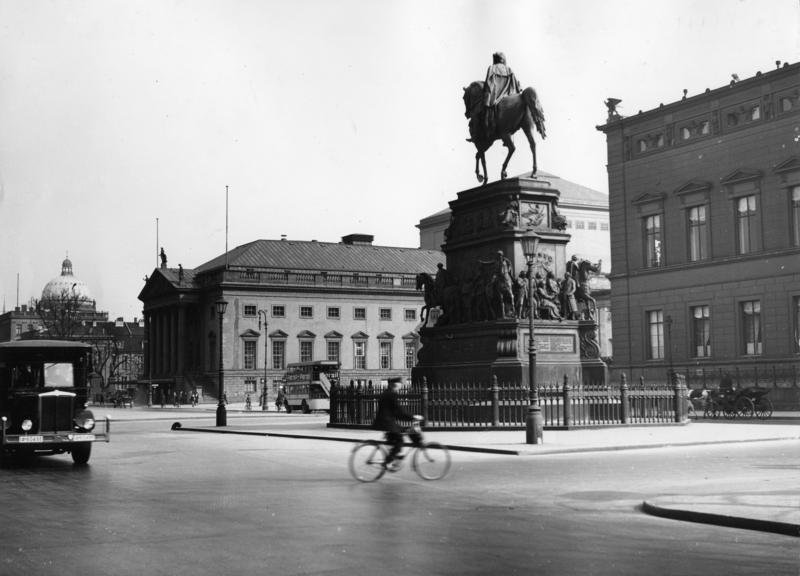
Looking towards the Berlin Palace, 1920s

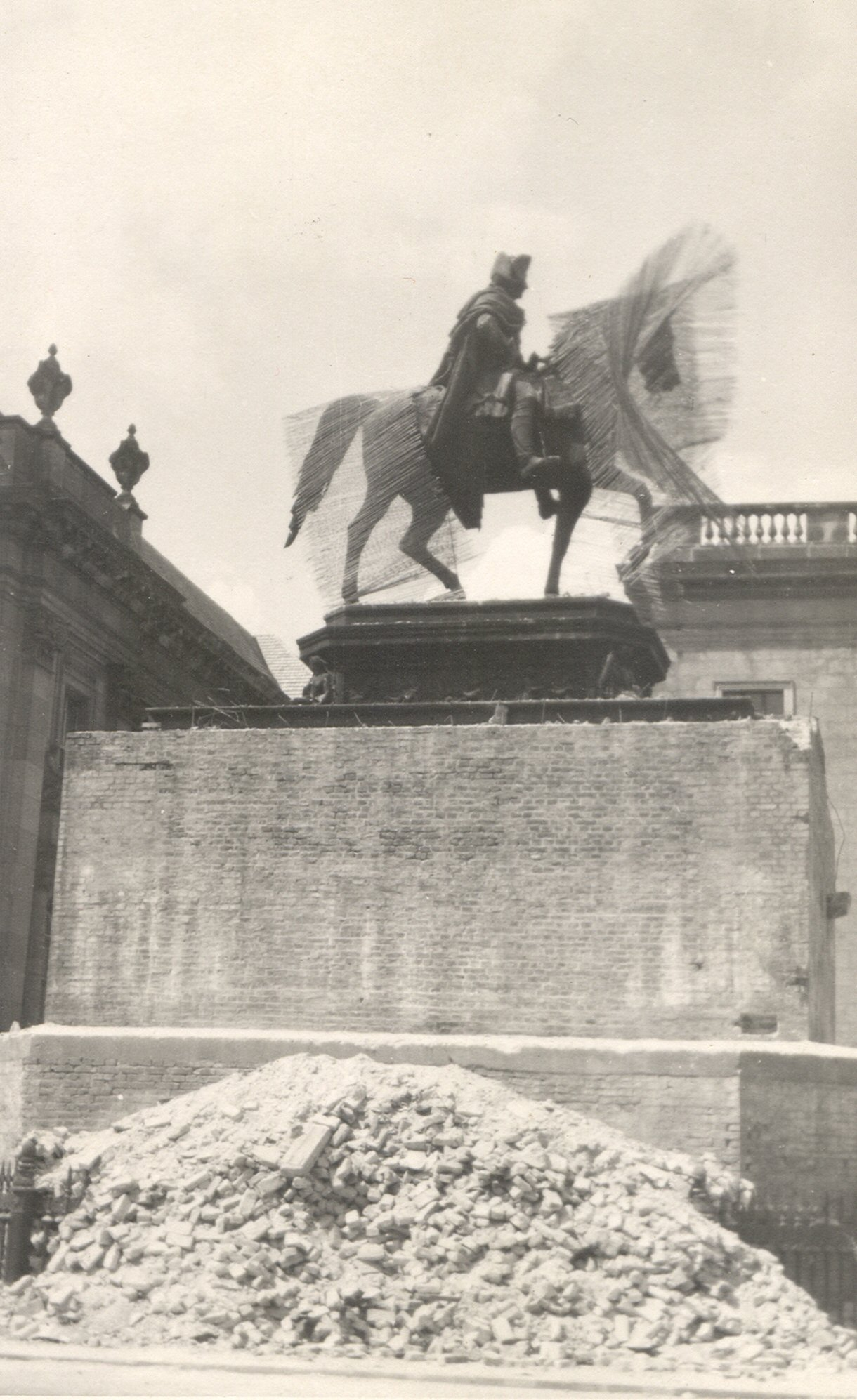
Removal of the casing, 1950

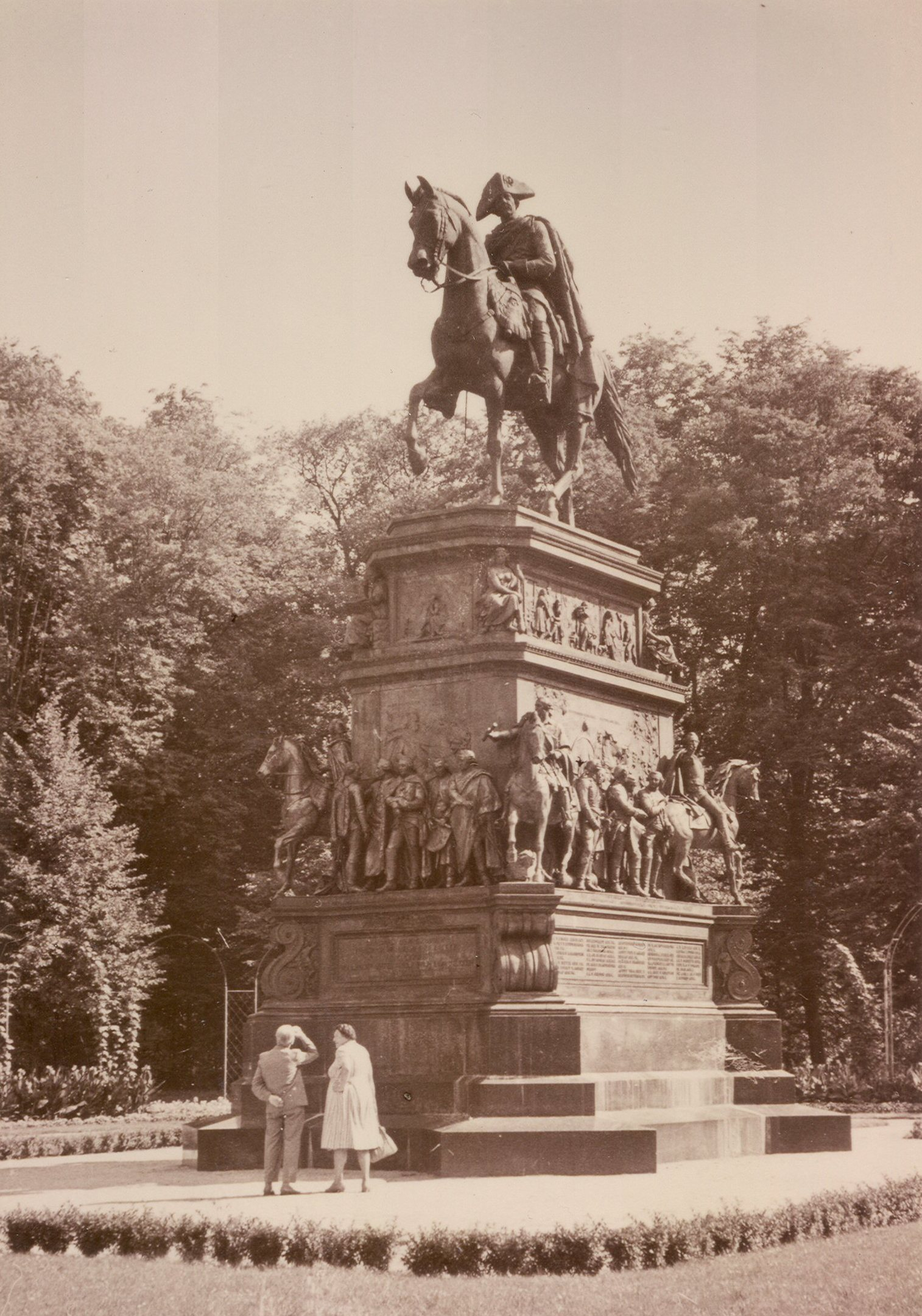
In the hippodrome at Charlottenhof Palace in Potsdam, c. 1963

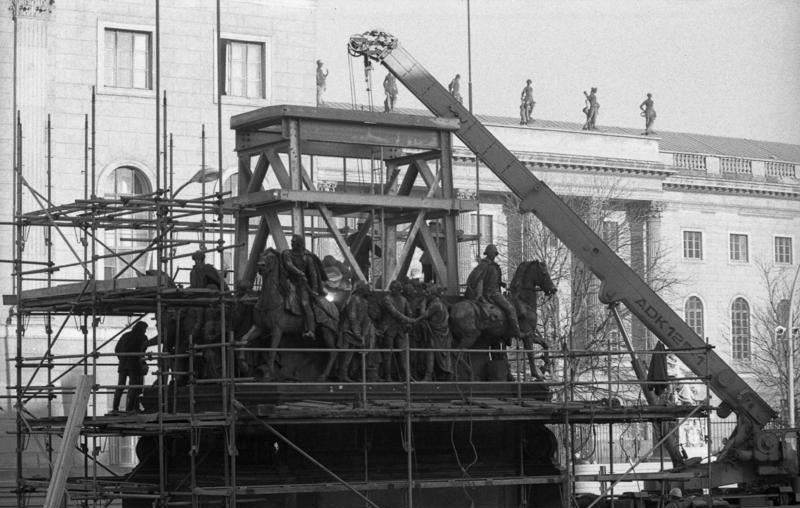
Return to the original location, 1980

== Description and location ==
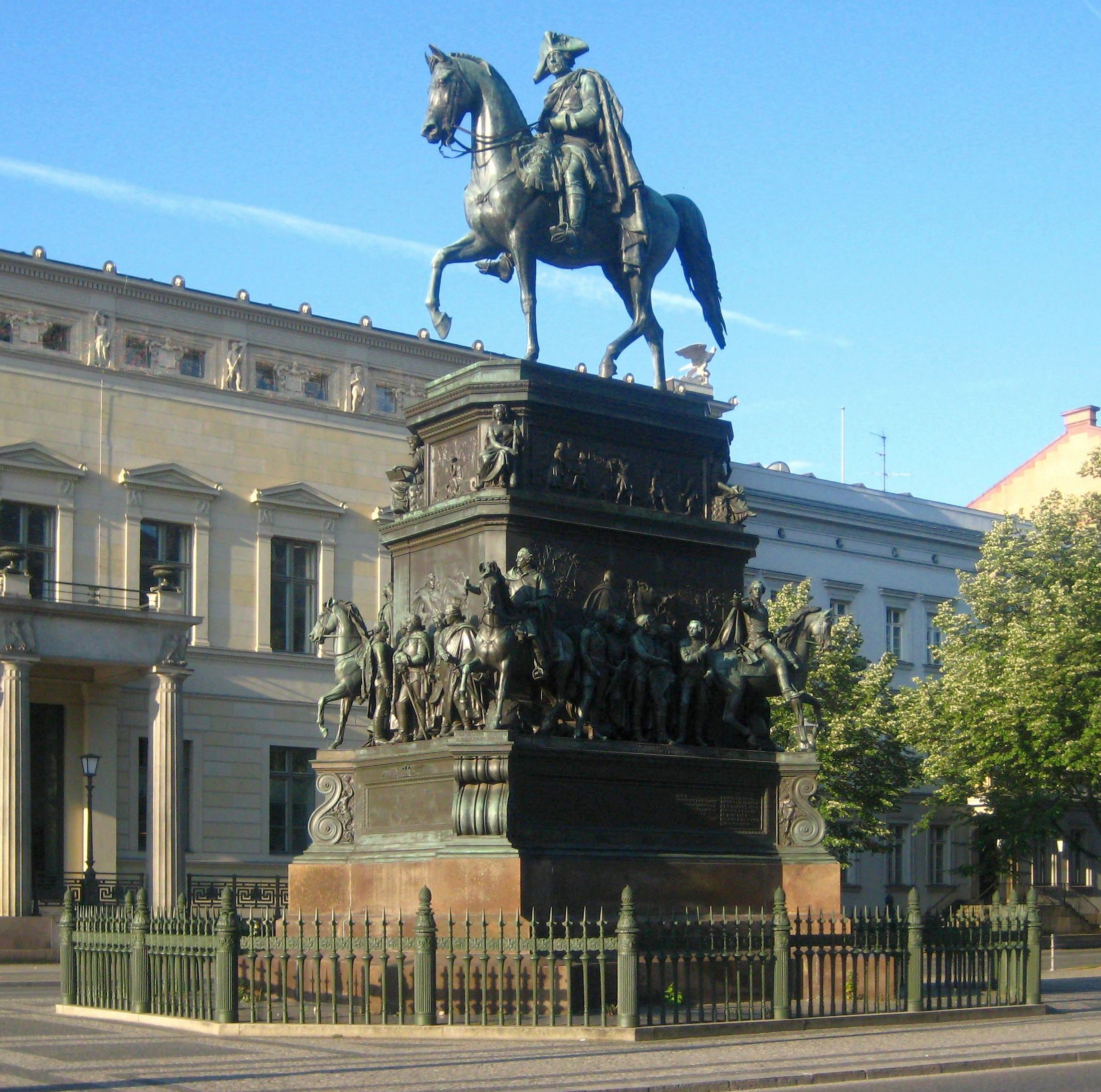
Equestrian statue of Frederick II

The monument is 13.5 metres (44 ft) tall, with the equestrian statue itself standing 5.66 metres (18.6 ft) high. It depicts Frederick in military uniform and an ermine-trimmed cloak, wearing his decorations, and with his characteristic bicorne hat; he holds the reins in his left hand and in his right has a walking stick. The statue is mounted on an unusually tall plinth, 7.84 metres (25.7 ft) high, bearing two bands of additional sculpture above a band of inscriptions: the upper section shows scenes from the king's life, with the four cardinal virtues at the corners, while the middle depicts 74 great men of Frederick the Great's time in life size, many in full relief.

The statue stands at the east end of Unter den Linden, facing east at the west end of the former Forum Fridericianum (now Bebelplatz) towards the site of the royal palace. It is enclosed by a low wrought-iron fence, which was recreated when the monument was restored and replaced in its original position.

=== Upper band ===
The upper sculpted band, immediately below the statue of the king, shows in bas-relief scenes from his life and is garnished at the corners with emblems of the four cardinal virtues in full relief.

The Virtues

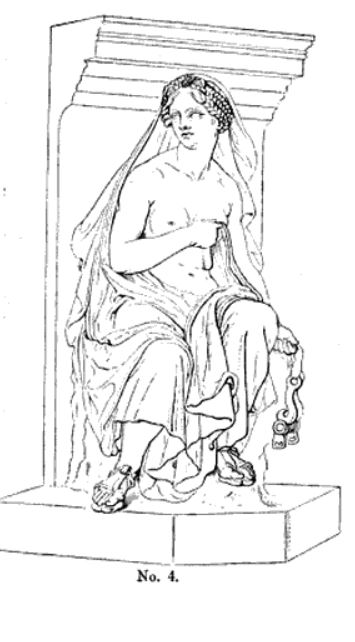
Moderation

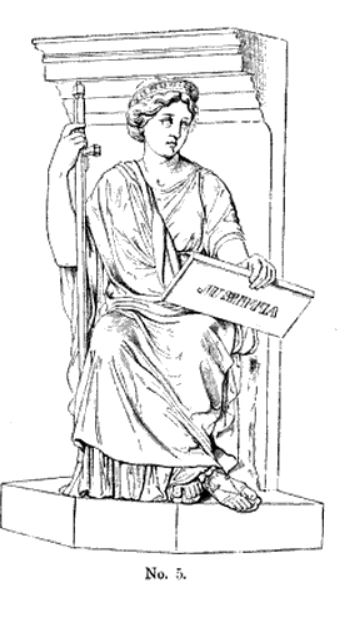
Justice

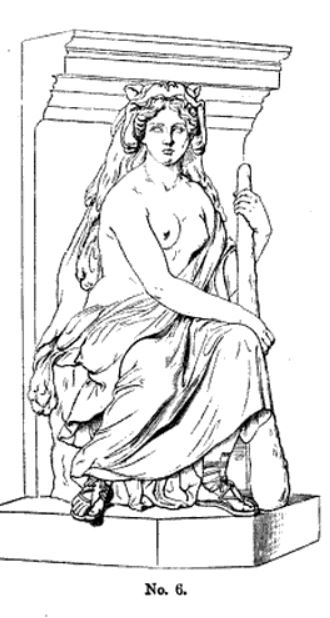
Courage

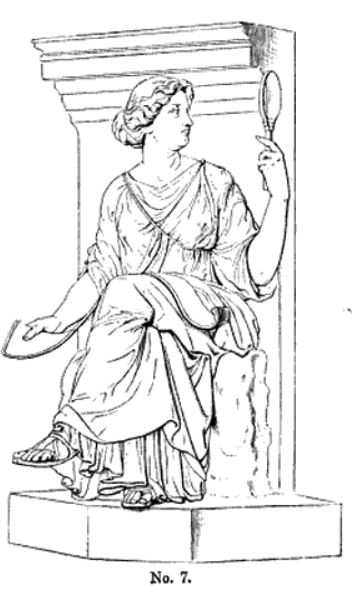
Prudence

=== Middle band ===
The middle band depicts 74 men of Frederick the Great's time in life-size; some, such as the figure of his brother August, are free-standing; others are depicted in high relief. A few, including James Keith, are in bas-relief. As with the upper band, four figures in full relief stand at the corners, this time on horseback: Frederick's brother, Prince Henry of Prussia; Charles William Ferdinand, Duke of Brunswick-Wolfenbüttel; Friedrich Wilhelm von Seydlitz; and Hans Joachim von Zieten.

Four mounted figures

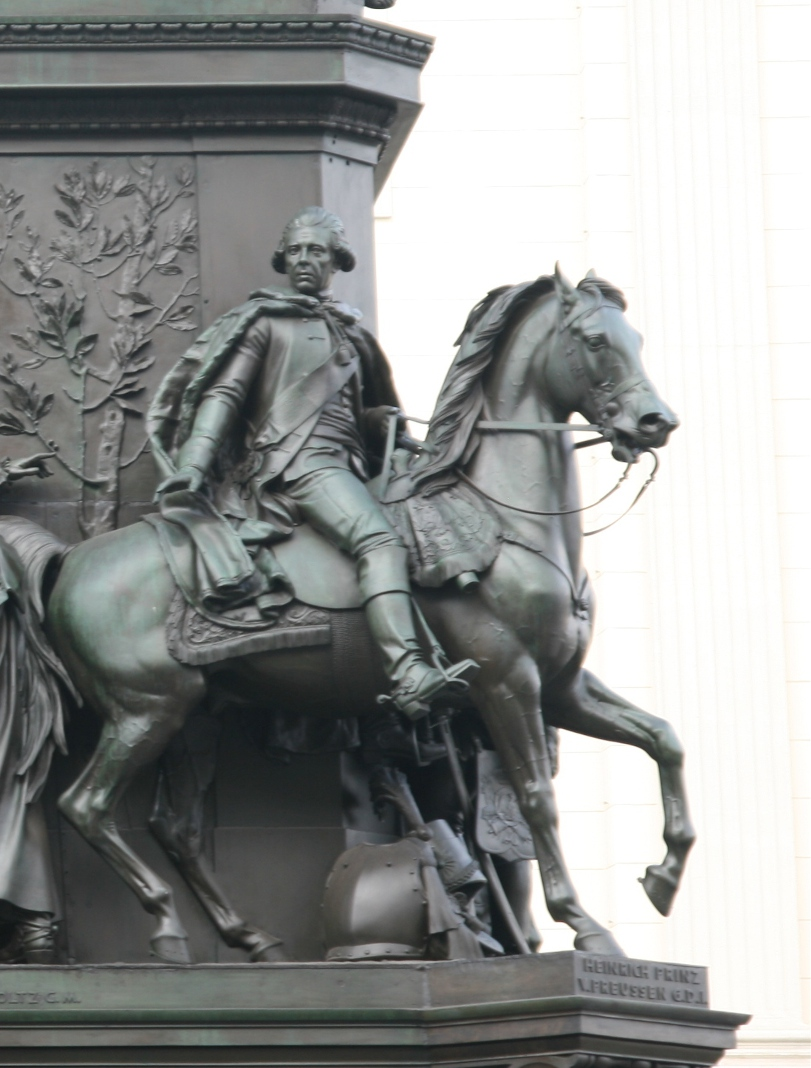
Prince Henry of Prussia, (1726–1802). Prince of Prussia. Frederick's brother.

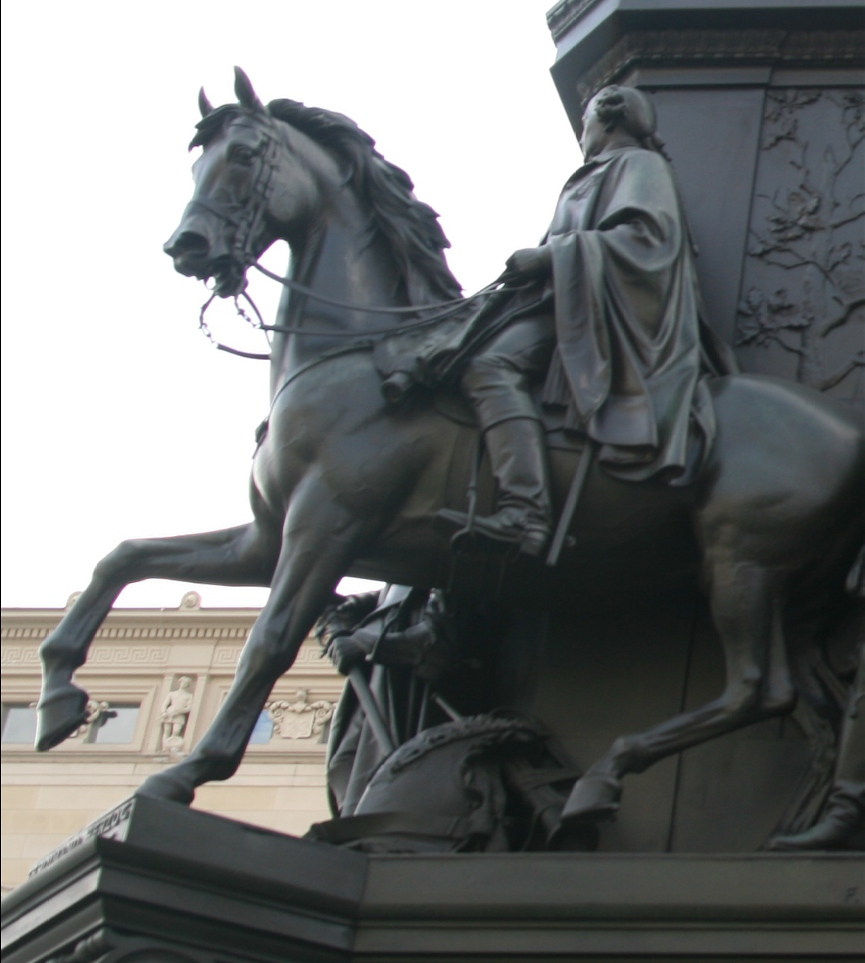
Field Marshal Ferdinand, Prince of Brunswick-Lüneburg (1721–1792)

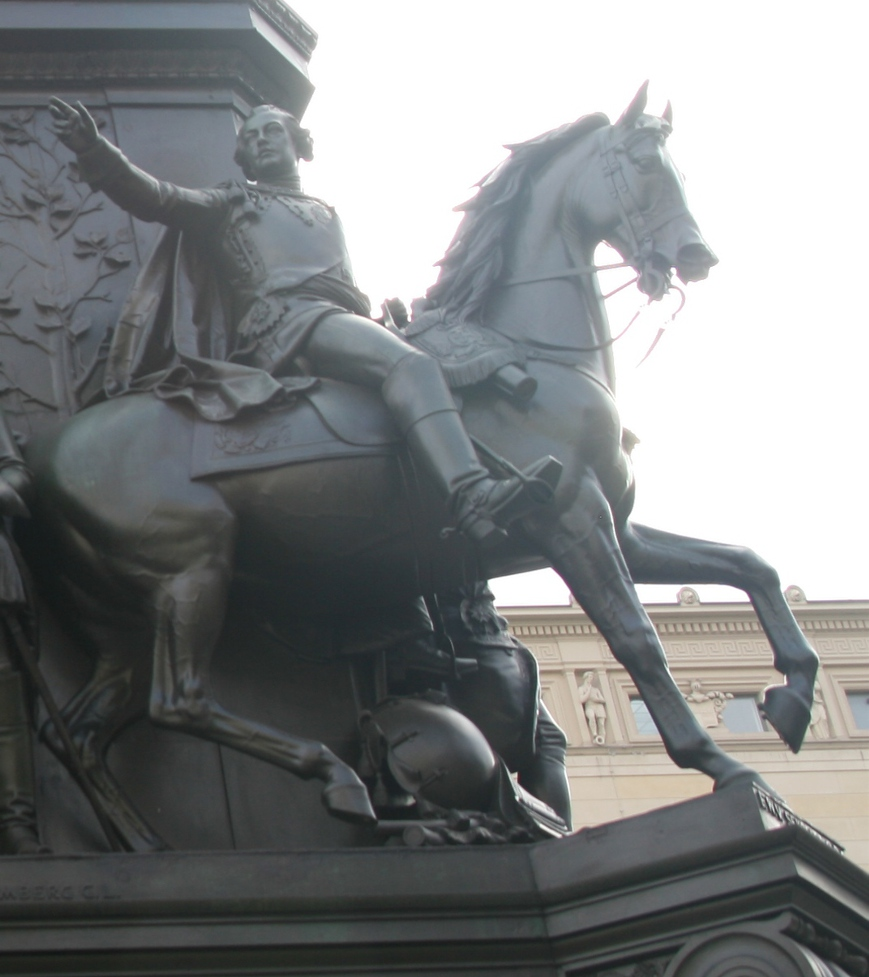
Lieutenant General and Inspector of Cavalry Friedrich Wilhelm von Seydlitz (1721–1783)

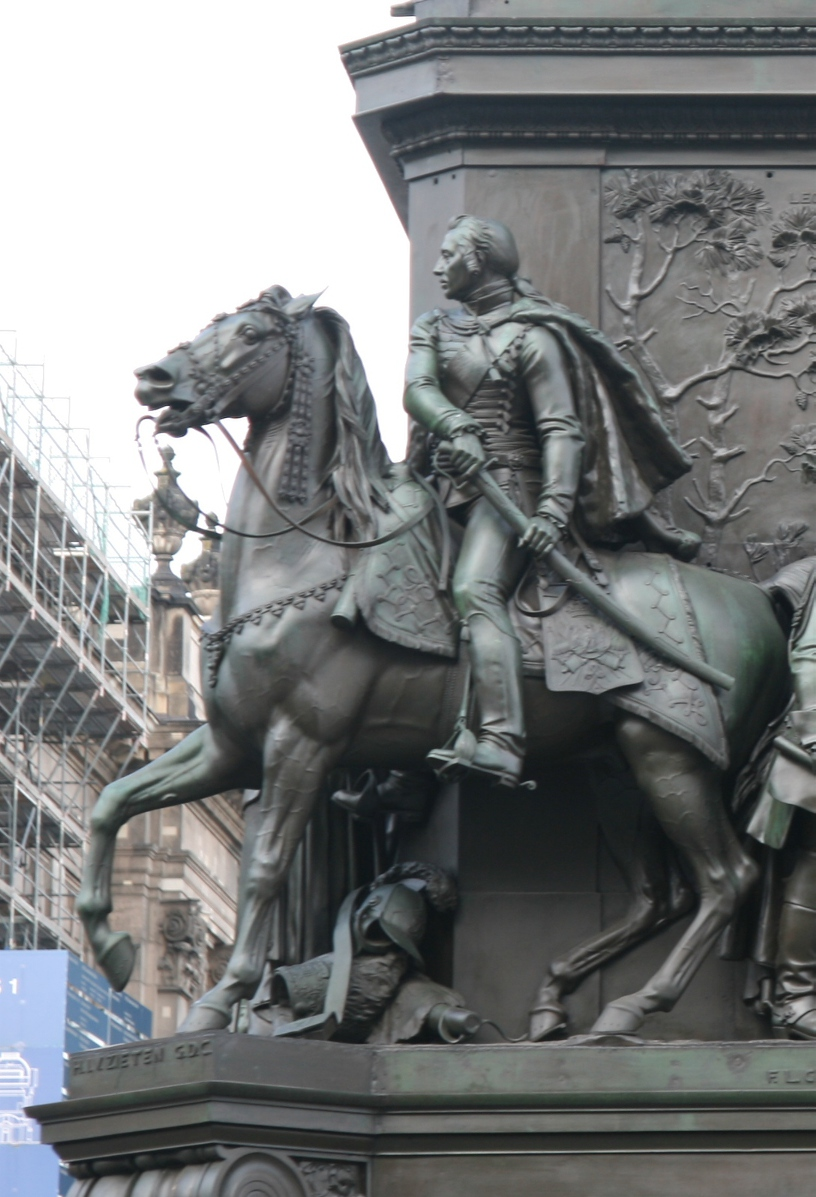
Lieutenant General and General of Cavalry Hans Joachim von Zieten, Zieten aus dem Busch (1699–1786)

Between the mounted figures stand 25 of the key men of Frederick's career. Some of them are full-sized free-standing figures and several are carved in partial relief. The figures represented are predominantly military, but also include civilians of note, including diplomats, the Prime Minister of Prussia, jurists, poets, artists, and philosophers.

indicates that the figure is in bas-relief.

| Lieutenant General Johann Dietrich von Hülsen, 1693–1767. Infantry. A man of legendary profanity, Governor of Berlin, and commander of armies at Lobositz and Torgau. Fought in five Prussian wars. | Lieutenant General Karl Wilhelm von Dieskau, 1701–1777. Artillery. General Inspector of Artillery. Designed new field guns, and organised the training of the horse artillery. |
| Lieutenant General Heinrich Sigismund von der Heyde, 1703–1765. Grenadier Battalion #4. Maintained the heroic defence at the three Sieges of Kolberg. | Lieutenant General Frederick II Eugene, Duke of Württemberg, 1732–1797. |
| Major General Hans Sigismund von Lestwitz, 1718–1788. His timely attack at the Battle of Torgau secured the victory and saved the army. | Lieutenant General Wilhelm Sebastian von Belling, 1719–1779. |
| General of Cavalry Joachim Bernhard von Prittwitz, 1726–1793. Cavalry. Led the Regiment Gendarmes. The only figure allowed to face the king, as he had saved the king's life at the Battle of Kunersdorf. | General of Infantry Prince Augustus William of Prussia, 1722–1758, father of Frederick William II. |
| † Field Marshal James Keith, 1693–1757. Infantry. Close friend and confidante of the king. Killed at the Battle of Hochkirch. | General of Cavalry Dubislav Friedrich von Platen, 1714–1787. Cavalry. Watched his two sons die at the Battle of Zorndorf. Successfully invaded Bamberg, taking many captives and gold. |
| Field Marshal Leopold II, Prince of Anhalt-Dessau 1700–1751. The "Young Dessauer". | † Major General Frederick Francis of Brunswick-Wolfenbüttel, 1732–1758. Brother of the Queen, killed at the Battle of Hochkirch. |
| Field Marshal Friedrich Leopold, Graf von Gessler, 1688–1762. Cavalry. During attack of the Bayreuth Dragoons at the Battle of Hohenfriedburg, his regiment captured 62 enemy flags. | (DOW) Lieutenant General Hans Karl von Winterfeldt, 1707–1757, Frederick's trusted advisor, founder of Prussian military intelligence unit, diplomat. |
| Lieutenant General Carl Heinrich von Wedel, 1712–1782. Infantry. His regiment was so successful at the Battle of Leuthen that 14 members received the Pour le Mérite. | Gotthold Ephraim Lessing, 1729–1781, Philosopher. |
| Prince Augustus Ferdinand of Prussia, 1730–1813, brother of the king. | Count Karl-Wilhelm Finck von Finckenstein, 1714–1800, Diplomat, Prime Minister of Prussia. |
| Field Marshal Leopold I, Prince of Anhalt-Dessau, 1676–1747, the "Old Dessauer". Talented drill master who modernised Prussian infantry. | Ernst Wilhelm von Schlabrendorf, 1719–1769, Prussian state minister in Silesia and Pomerania. |
| † Field Marshal Kurt Christoph, Graf von Schwerin, 1684–1757. Infantry. A member of the military court that tried Frederick for desertion in 1730. Killed at the Battle of Prague. | Johann Heinrich von Carmer, 1720–1801. Chancellor and First Minister of Justice for Frederick and his nephew. Prussian jurist and judicial reformer. |
| Major General Frederick William von Kleist, 1724–1767. Cavalry. Commander of the Green Hussars. Commanded an independent corps that participated in the "Glorious Raid of 1762". | Carl Heinrich Graun, 1704–1759. Prussian tenor and composer. |
| Lieutenant General Karl Christoph von der Goltz, 1707–1761. Infantry. Charged with defence of Glogau. | Immanuel Kant, 1724–1804. Philosopher. |
| † Hartwig Karl von Wartenberg 1711–1757. Hussar. Major General. Killed in action at Alt-Bunzlau. |

Relief Figures

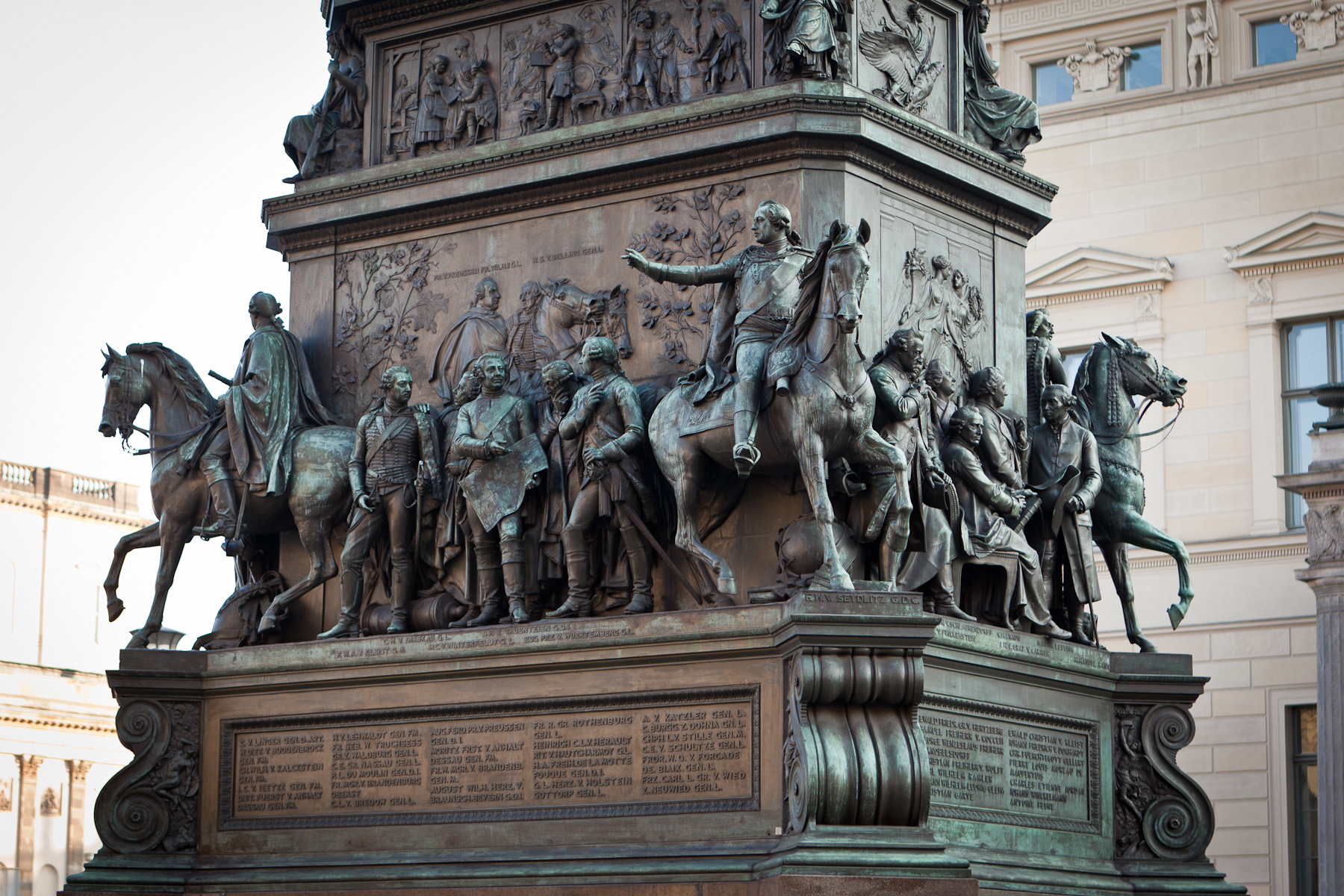
Mounted (left): Duke Ferdinand. Partial Relief: Augustus and Belling. Foreground: Kleist, Dieskau, Winterfeldt. Mounted (right): Seydlitz.

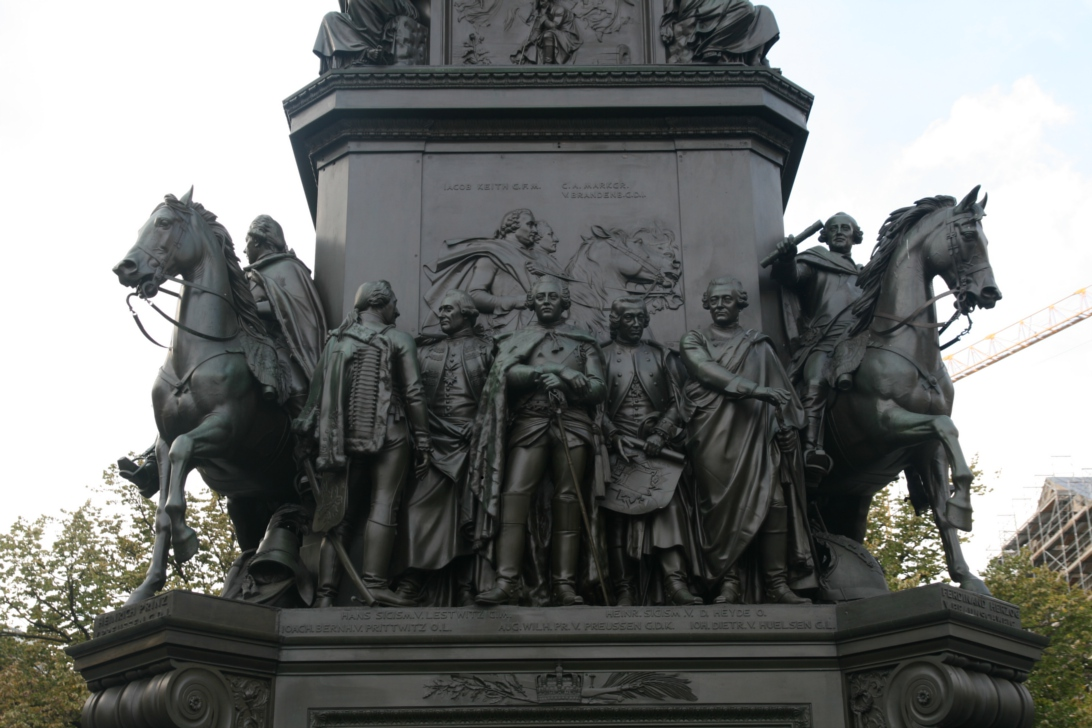
(Left to right) Joachim Bernhard von Prittwitz, Hans Sigismund von Lestwitz, Prince Augustus William of Prussia, Heinrich Sigismund von der Heyde, Johann Dietrich von Hülsen

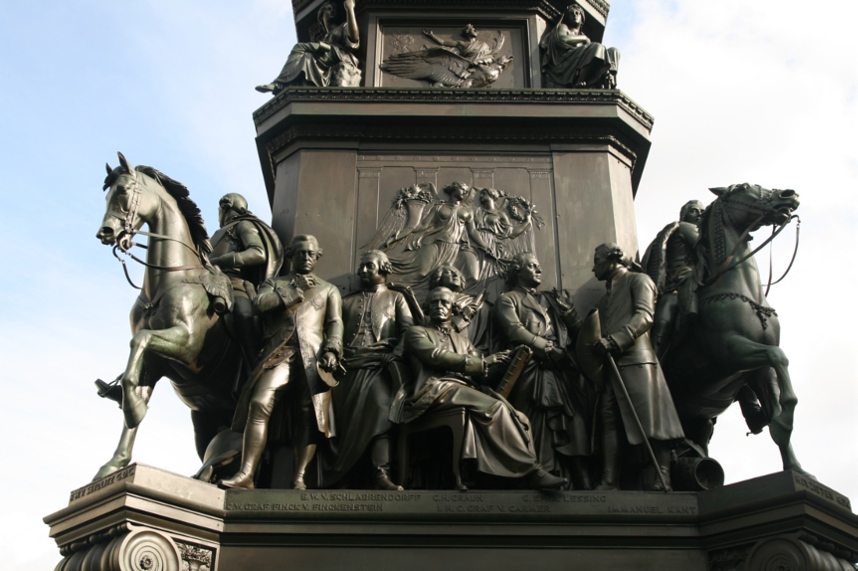
Mounted (to the left): Seydlitz, Count Finckenstein, Schlabrendorf, Graun, Count von Carmer, Lessing, Kant, Mounted (to the right): Zeiten

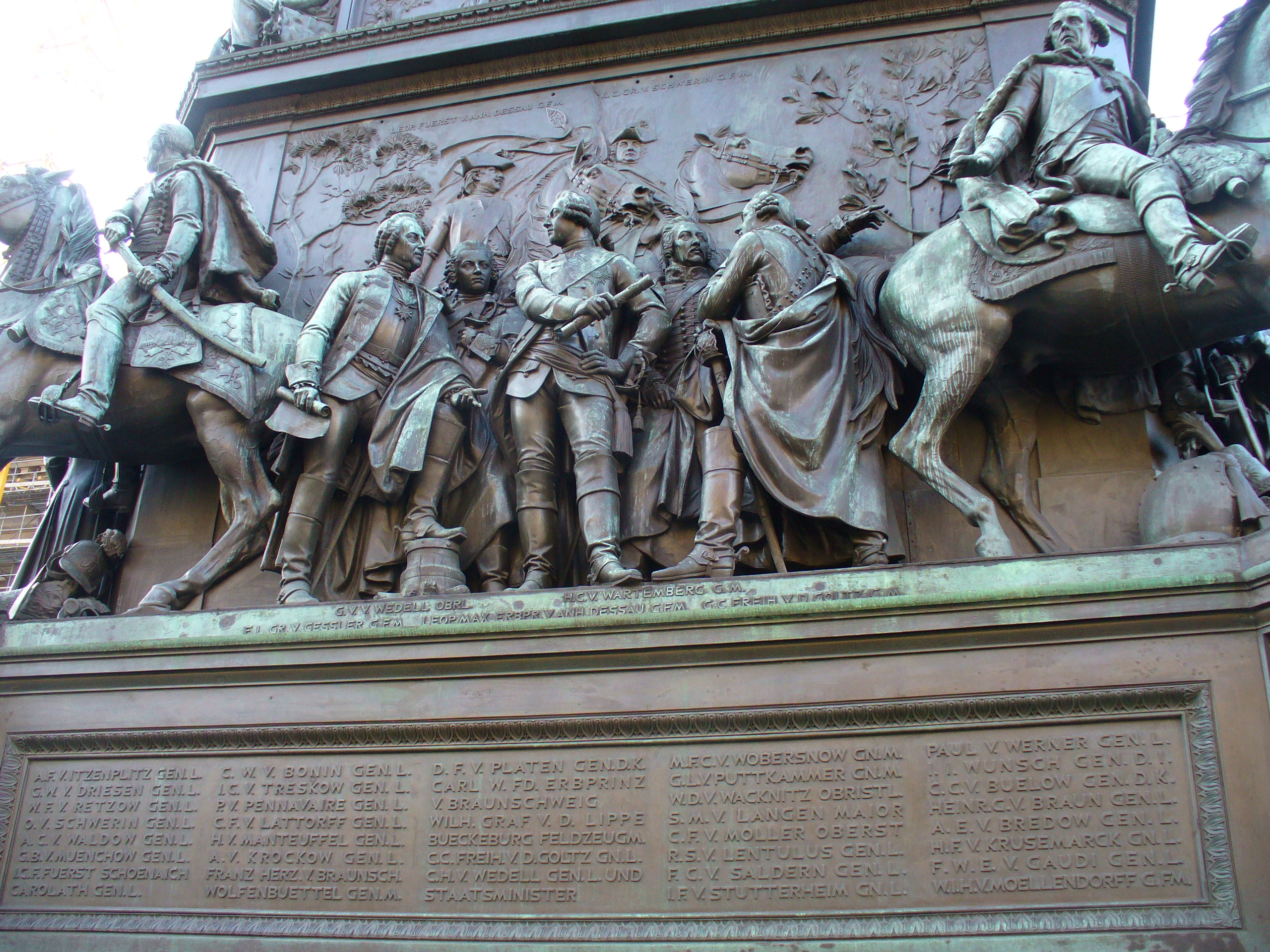
Dessau and Schwerin appear in partial relief. Foreground: Gessler, Wedel, the "Young Dessauer", Wartenberg, Freiherr von der Golz.

=== Lower band ===
The lowest band lists names of additional key figures from Frederick's reign, pressed in bronze.

==== South face ====
The south face displays bronze plaques with the names of 25 generals.

| General of Artillery Christian Nicolaus von Linger, 1669–1755. Artillery. Son of a master armorer. Founded Prussian Artillery. | Field Marshal Hans von Lehwaldt, 1685–1768. Grenadier Guards. Reliable favourite of Frederick; he mentored Frederick's up-and-coming officers. |
| Major General Prince Augustus Ferdinand of Prussia, 1730–1813. Infantry. Brother of Frederick. Grandson of George I of Great Britain. | Lieutenant General Friedrich Rudolf von Rothenburg, 1710–1751. Dragoons. Friend of the king, member of the Round Table of Frederick's closest friends. |
| Lieutenant General Nikolaus Andreas von Katzler, 1696–1760. Gens d'armes. Entrepid soldier. | Field Marshal Wilhelm Dietrich von Buddenbrock, 1672–1757. Cavalry. Companion of Frederick's father. |
| † Lieutenant General Friedrich Sebastian Wunibald Truchsess zu Waldburg, 1677–1745. Known as "Trux". Infantry. Diplomat. Trusted confidant of the king. Died at the Battle of Hohenfriedburg. | Field Marshal Prince Moritz of Anhalt-Dessau, 1712–1760, Infantry. Sixth son of the "Old Dessauer". Promoted on the field after the Battle of Leuthen. |
| (DOW) Lieutenant General Heinrich Karl Ludwig de Herault, 1689–1757. Infantry. Died of injuries received at the Battle of Prague. Descended from Huguenot refugees. | Lieutenant General Christoph II von Dohna, 1702–1762. Infantry. Commanded various infantry regiments: Nr. 4; Nr. 23; Nr.16. |
| Field Marshal Christoph Wilhelm von Kalckstein, 1682–1759. Infantry. Frederick's tutor; also supervisor of the Charité hospital in Berlin. | Lieutenant General Ernst Christoph von Nassau, 1686–1755. Cuirassier. Saved the king and his army when they were trapped at Königgrätz in 1745. |
| Lieutenant General Charles Frederick Albert, Margrave of Brandenburg-Schwedt, 1705–1752. Infantry. Frederick's cousin, Grand Master of the Order of St. John in Brandenburg. | Lieutenant General and General of Infantry Heinrich August de la Motte Fouqué, 1698–1774. Füsiliers. Friend of Frederick's, one of the few permitted to visit him during his incarceration at Küstrin. Grand Master of the "Order of Bayard", a group of Frederick's friends. Descended from Huguenot refugees. |
| Major General Christoph Ludwig von Stille, 1686–1752. Infantry. Educated man who spoke several languages and introduced Frederick to poets and philosophers. | Field Marshal Joachim Christoph von Jeetze, 1672–1753. Infantry. Instrumental in the victory at Kesseldorf in 1745. Suffered a fatal stroke while visiting Frederick in Potsdam. |
| General of Infantry Peter Ludwig du Moulin, 1681–1756. Infantry. Quartermaster of Field Armies. Descended from Huguenot refugees. | Lieutenant General Augustus William, Duke of Brunswick-Bevern, 1715–1781. Infantry. Conducted the defensive campaign of 1757–1758 with great skill. |
| Lieutenant General Georg Ludwig von Schleswig-Holstein-Gottorf, 1719–1763. Infantry. Dismissed in 1761, he served briefly in the Russian Army and retired to Holstein to start a faience factory. | † Lieutenant General Kaspar Ernst von Schultze, 1691–1757. Life Guards. Initially in artillery; joined Frederick's own Life Guard regiment in 1732. Killed at the Battle of Breslau. |
| Field Marshal Dietrich of Anhalt-Dessau, 1702–1769. Infantry. Third son of the "Old Dessauer". | † Lieutenant General Frederick William of Brandenburg-Schwedt, 1714–1744. Foot Guards. Cousin of the king. Died at the Siege of Prague after being struck by a cannonball. |
| Lieutenant General Friedrich Wilhelm Quirin von Forcade de Biaix, 1698–1765. Infantry. Succeeded his father as leader of the 23rd Infantry Regiment. Twice wounded and left for dead on the battlefield. Descended from Huguenot refugees | Lieutenant General Kaspar Ludwig von Bredow, 1685–1773. Foot Guards. Frederick's military mentor. Accompanied Frederick on his early campaigns in the Rhineland; served as intermediary between Frederick and his estranged father. |
| | Lieutenant General Franz Karl Ludwig von Wied zu Neuwied, 1710–1765. Infantry. Led the 41st Infantry Regiment. Reliable field commander. Retired with broken health. |

==== North face ====
The north face contains the names of 32 key military figures in Frederick's life. Thirty-two are generals; three are men who contributed significantly to various battles but because of early deaths did not reach the highest military rank.

| Lieutenant General August Friedrich von Itzenplitz, 1693–1759. Infantry. In 1759 led a raid against Bamberg and eluded the Imperial army. | Lieutenant General Georg Wilhelm von Driesen, 1700–1758. Curaissiers. Instrumental in the Battles of Prague and Leuthen. |
| Lieutenant General Wolf Frederick von Retzow, 1699–1758. Grenadiers. Started a weaver's colony near Potsdam at Frederick's orders. Refused a suicide mission preliminary to the Battle of Hochkirch and was removed from command. | Lieutenant General Otto Magnus von Schwerin, 1701–1777. Dragoons. Led the Bayreuth Dragoons at the Battle of Hohenfriedberg. His opinions often placed him in conflict with the king, so he was never raised to comital status. |
| (DOW) Lieutenant General Arnold Christoph von Waldow, 1672–1734. Cavalry. Commanded left wing at the Battle of Chotusitz | Major General Gustav Bogislav von Münchow, 1686–1766. Frederick's valet de chambre when he was still Crown Prince. Envoy to Vienna in 1740. |
| Major General Johann Carl Friedrich zu Carolath-Beuthen, 1716–1791. Cuirassier. Started in Austrian service, transferred to Prussian service in 1741. Served as a diplomat in Poland. | Lieutenant General Kasimir Wedig von Bonin, 1691–1752. Cavalry. Instrumental in the victory at Hohenfriedburg. |
| Lieutenant General Joachim Christian von Tresckow, 1698–1762. Infantry. Defended the city of Neisse after the Prussian loss at Hochkirch, waiting for relief from the main army. | (DOW) Lieutenant General Peter von Pennavaire, 1690–1759. Cavalry. Led Cuirassier Regiment No. 11. Nicknamed "the Anvil" because he was beaten so often. Descended from Huguenot refugees. |
| Lieutenant General Christoph Friedrich von Lattorf, 1696–1762. Infantry. Resisted the Austrian siege at Kosel until relieved by General von der Golz. | Lieutenant General Heinrich von Manteuffel, 1696–1778. Infantry. At the Battle of Prague in 1757, picked up his fallen regimental colours and led a successful assault on the Austrian lines. |
| Lieutenant General Anton von Krockow, 1714–1778. Infantry, Dragoons. Adjutant to Frederick. | Major General Dubislav Friedrich von Platen, 1714–1787. Cavalry. Saw two of his sons die at the Battle of Zorndorf; participated in the 1759 raid on Bamberg with von Kleist. |
| Major General Carl Wilhelm Ferdinand von Braunschweig, 1735–1806. Military theoretician. | Major General Wilhelm Graf v. d. Lippe-Bückeburg 1724–1788. Military theoretician. |
| Lieutenant General Friedrich Wilhelm von Gaudi, 1725–1788. Frederick's aide-de-camp. Identified French movement at the Battle of Rossbach that allowed Frederick to outflank them. Inspector of the Regiments in Westphalia. Descended from Scottish refugees. | Lieutenant General Carl Heinrich von Wedel, 1712–1782. Infantry. Successful regimental action during the Battle of Leuthen resulted in award of 14 Pour le Mérites. Badly wounded at Kunersdorf and retired. |
| † Lieutenant General Moritz Franz Kasimir von Wobersnow, 1708–1759. Killed at the Battle of Kay. | † Major General Georg Ludwig von Puttkamer, 1715–1759. Hussars. Killed at the Battle of Kunersdorf. |
| Colonel William Dietrich von Wakenitz, 1728–1805. Cuirassier. Led the Cuirassier Regiment No. 5. Considered by some of his contemporaries to be among the best commanders in the army, but his enemies blocked promotions. Transferred to Hessian service. | † Major Siegmund Moritz William von Langen, 1704–1758. Hero of the Battle of Hochkirch; his company held the Hochkirch cemetery long enough for the Prussian army to organise its retreat. |
| Colonel Karl Friedrich von Moller, 1690–1762. Artillery. Brilliant artillery commander instrumental at the Battle of Rossbach. | Lieutenant General Robert Scipio von Lentulus, 1714–1786. Originally in Austrian service, recruited by the "Old Dessauer" to join the Prussian military. Served on several diplomatic missions for Frederick. Governor of Neuchâtel, part of Hohenzollern territory. |
| Lieutenant General Friedrich Christoph von Saldern, 1719–1785. Infantry. Codified military training and tactics. | Lieutenant General and General of Infantry Joachim Friedrich von Stutterheim, 1715–1783. Infantry. Fought in all of Frederick's wars. |
| Lieutenant General Paul von Werner, 1707–1785. Hussars. Recruited from Habsburg service by Hans Karl von Winterfeldt. | Lieutenant General Johann Jakob von Wunsch, 1717–1788. Infantry. Soldier of Fortune. Joined Frederick for the Seven Years' War. Developed Prussian light infantry tactics. |
| Lieutenant General Christoph Karl von Bülow, 1716–1788. Cavalry. Reliable commander of cavalry regiments throughout the Seven Years' War. In the War of Bavarian Succession, commanded the entire right wing. | Lieutenant General Heinrich Gottlob von Braun, 1717–1798. Grenadiers. Participated in Frederick's funeral procession. |
| Lieutenant General Asmus Ehrenreich von Bredow, 1693–1753. Infantry. Led the Infantry Regiment 21, inducted into Prussian Academy of Sciences in 1753. | Lieutenant General Hans-Friedrich von Krusemark, 1720–1775. Cavalry, Gens d'armes. Inspector of cavalry. Appointed to Frederick's general staff. |
| | Field Marshal Wichard von Möllendorf, 1724–1816. Cavalry. Fought in all Prussian wars from 1741 to 1806. Wounded and captured at Jena-Auerstedt in 1806, awarded the Cross of the Legion of Honour by Napoleon. |

==== West face ====
The west face includes 14 men who contributed to the Prussian state as diplomats, authors, jurists, architects, painters and poets.

| Ewald Friedrich von Hertzberg, 1725–1795. Statesman, diplomat, author. Especially notable in the diplomatic expansion of Prussian territories. | Samuel Freiherr von Cocceji, 1679–1755. Jurist. Chief Justice. |
| George Wenzeslaus Freiherr von Knobelsdorff, 1699–1753. Painter, architect. Drafted Frederick's drawings of the proposed Sanssouci into architectural plans and directed its construction. | Christian Freiherr von Wolff, 1679–1754. Philosopher, known for ontology or philosophia prima, cosmology, rational psychology, and natural theology. Expelled from Prussia by Frederick William I, invited back by Frederick. |
| Carl Wilhelm Ramler, 1725–1798. Poet. Taught logic at the Prussian Cadet School; wrote Der Tod Jesu, which was later adapted to oratoria by several musicians (including J.S. Bach). Director of the Royal Theater. | Johann Wilhelm Ludwig Gleim, 1709–1803. Poet. Personal secretary to Frederick William of Brandenburg-Schwedt, accompanied the Prussian army on campaigns in the Silesia wars. Friend of Ewald von Kleist, Garve, Ramler; many of his poems were set to music during the Seven Years' War and became popular as marching tunes and camp ballads. |
| Christian Garve, 1742–1798. Enlightenment philosopher. An empirical philosopher, he translated a portion of Cicero's De Officiis at Frederick's request and is known also for his translations of Adam Smith's works. | (DOW) Ewald Christian von Kleist, 1715–1759. Poet and soldier, killed at the Battle of Kunersdorf. |
| Johann Friedrich von Domhardt, 1712–1781. State administrator, engineer. Expanded the Angrapa River's flood containment and irrigation systems (1764–1774). Settled 15,000 colonists in East Prussia. Planned the Masurian Canal. | Christian Gellert, 1715–1769. Poet and storyteller. Wrote fables, dramatic comedies, and a psychological novel. |
| Pierre-Louis Moreau de Maupertuis, 1698–1759. Mathematician. First President of the Prussian Academy of Sciences. | Charles-Étienne Jordan, 1700–1745. Literary secretary to Frederick. Author, collector. Descended from Huguenot refugees. |
| Johann Joachim Winckelmann, 1717–1768. A Hellenist art historian and archaeologist, he first articulated the difference between Greek, Greco-Roman and Roman art. | Antoine Pesne, 1683–1757. Artist, Court painter. Director of the Berlin Academy of the Arts |

==== East face ====
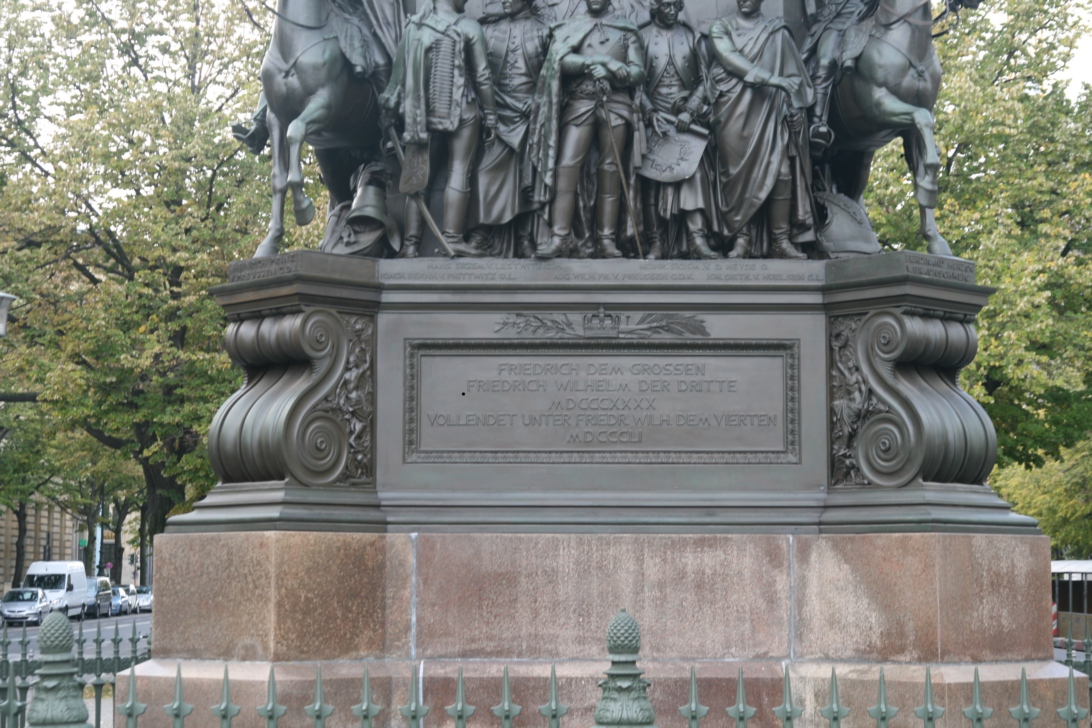
Bronze plaque on the lower east face

The east face bears the names of Frederick the Great, Frederick William III, and Frederick William IV, along with the dates on which the monument was commissioned and completed.

== Other statues of Frederick the Great ==
Johann Gottfried Schadow, who was Rauch's teacher and had received many commissions under the previous king, Frederick William II, had expected to carry out this commission. He had already in 1821–22 made a lifesize bronze of Frederick the Great with two greyhounds, which is at Sanssouci. He also created a marble statue of Frederick for the city of Stettin, now lost, a bronze reproduction of which is now in the grounds outside the New Wing at Charlottenburg Palace.

In 1865 two students of Rauch's, Aloisio Lazzerini and Carlo Baratta, made an approximately half-size copy in marble of Rauch's equestrian statue, which is in the park at Sanssouci.

Another smaller copy of Rauch's statue was made to commemorate Frederick's overnight stay in the Dehlitz section of Lützen before the Battle of Rossbach in 1757, and stood in a park there from 1858 until World War II, when it was moved for safekeeping to Lützen Castle.

== See also ==
- Media related to Equestrian statue of Frederick the Great at Wikimedia Commons
- List of equestrian statues in Germany
- List of tourist attractions in Berlin
- Statue of Frederick the Great (Schloss Charlottenburg), another monument in Berlin dedicated to Frederick the Great

== Further information ==
- Jutta von Simson. Das Berliner Denkmal für Friedrich den Großen. Die Entwürfe als Spiegelung des preußischen Selbstverständnisses. Frankfurt/Berlin: Ullstein/Propyläen, 1976, ISBN 3-549-06619-8 (in German)
- Bloch, Peter; Grzimek, Waldemar (1978). Die Berliner Bildhauerschule im neunzehnten Jahrhundert. Das klassische Berlin (in German). Berlin: Propyläen. ISBN 978-3-549-06631-7.
- Frank Pieter Hesse and Gesine Sturm (ed.). Ein Denkmal für den König. Das Reiterstandbild für Friedrich II. Unter den Linden in Berlin. Beiträge zur Denkmalpflege in Berlin 17. Berlin: Schelzky & Jeep, 2001, ISBN 978-3-89541-158-8 (German/English picture book)
- Wieland Giebel (ed.). Das Reiterdenkmal Friedrichs des Großen. Berlin: Story, 2007, ISBN 978-3-929829-69-3 (in German)
- Majestät reiten wieder, video on restoration completed in 2001, Mefisto Video GmbH (Windows Media Player) (in German)
