= William Dietrich von Wakenitz =

- Born: 2 August 1728; Neu Boltenhagen
- Died: 9 January 1805 (aged 76) Kassel
- Allegiance: Kingdom of Prussia; Landgraviate of Hesse-Kassel
- Branch: Prussian Army
- Service years: 1744–1762 (Prussia); 1763–1793 (Hesse-Kassel)
- Rank: General of Infantry
- Conflicts: War of the Austrian Succession; Seven Years' War
- Awards: Pour le Mérite; Order of the Golden Lion; Name inscribed on Frederick the Great's Equestrian Statue

William Dietrich von Wakenitz, also Wackenitz or Wacknitz, 2 August 1728 on the family estate at Neu Boltenhagen–9 January 1805 in Kassel). He served in the Prussian army during the War of Austrian Succession and the Seven Years' War as a cavalry officer; subsequently, he served the Landgraviate of Hesse-Kassel as general and finance minister.

== Family ==
Wakenitz was born on his father's estate in Boltenhagen. His father, Karl Philipp Wakenitz (1697–1739) was a lieutenant colonel in the Swedish Army. His mother was Charlotte Louise von Örtzen (* 1699) from Blümenow.

== Prussian service ==
Wakenitz entered military service on 9 July 1744, as a cornet in the Gardes du Corps. During the second Silesian War, he was instrumental in the Battle of Hohenfriedberg, and received with several other officers the Order Pour le Mérite.

At the outbreak of the Seven Years' War he was a lieutenant. When the Corps was supplemented with two squadrons of Saxon soldiers, he received a command over them. According to Friedrich Adolf Graf von Kalckreuth, Wakenitz personally took Georg Christian, Fürst von Lobkowitz as prisoner in the initial skirmishing of the war. On 1 October 1756, he fought at the Battle of Lobositz; he became Rittmeister (captain of cavalry) on 24 February 1757. The Corps subsequently fought at the battles of Prague, Roßbach and Leuthen. The Corps commander, Lieutenant Colonel von Blumenthal, who had been severely wounded in Lobositz, died, and his planned successor had left the army because of disagreements. Thus Rittmeister Wakenitz became commander of the Garde du Corps from 1758–1760. At the engagement in the Battle of Zorndorf, he was able to turn the Russian flank and was immediately promoted to lieutenant colonel. Among the leaders of the Garde du Corps, he was unquestionably the most meritorious, and according to the judgment of Friedrich Wilhelm von Seydlitz, he was a man worthy to be placed at the head of the Prussian cavalry, but he must have made enemies; he was told that in Zorndorf he had taken a Russian officer, contrary to orders, into his protection, and the Russian had shot a member of the Garde du Corps. On 6 May 1760, he was promoted to Colonel and Commander of the Cuirassier Regiment No.5 (Markgraf Friedrich). He went to Berlin, but on the occasion of the Russian-Austrian occupation of the city, he became a prisoner of war on 7 October 1760. He was freed when the new Czar Peter III, withdrew from the war with Prussia. Wakenitz returned to Prussia in 1762, and he requested his leave, which he received on the 11 December 1762.

== Hessian service ==
Frederick II, Landgrave of Hesse-Kassel sought Prussian officers in order to improve his army, and, on 14 June 1763, Wakenitz entered the Duke's service as major general. In May 1764 he received the command of the Cavalry Regiment Gens d'Armes. On 17 January 1765, he was appointed proprietor. He rose to the rank of lieutenant general on 27 October 1772, and on 19 August 1774, became secret minister of state (finance minister). Together with Martin Ernst von Schlieffen and Friedrich Christian von Jungkenn (called Müntzer of the Mohren tribe); together they were known as the Prussian junta.

He was made a knight of the Order of the Golden Lion on 25 August 1773 and on 5 March 1769, the Pour la Vertu Militaire. He died on 9 January 1805 in Kassel. In 1851, his name was included on the Equestrian statue of Frederick the Great.
