= Franz Karl Ludwig von Wied zu Neuwied =

Christoph Wilhelm von Kalckstein
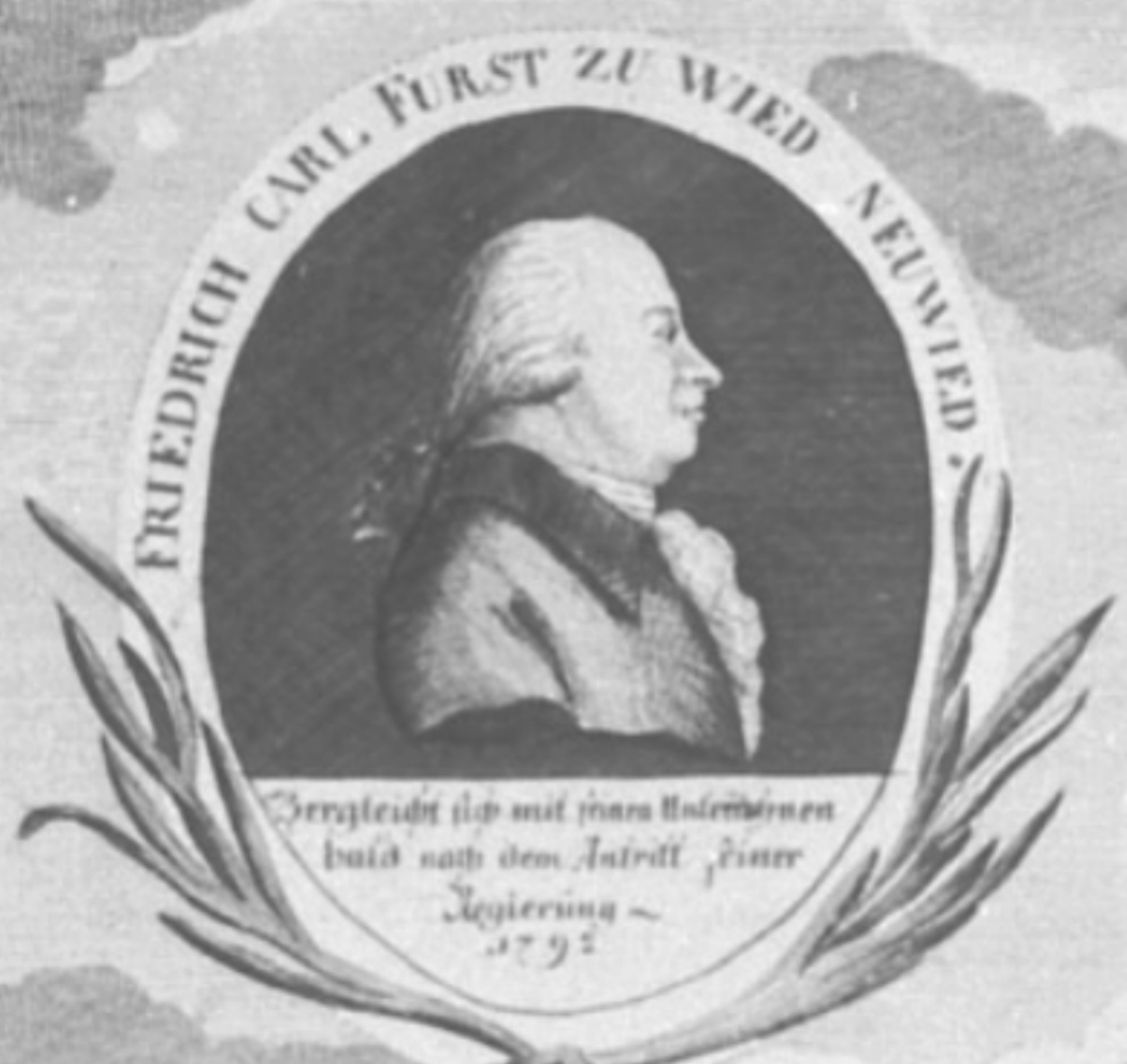
- Born: 19 October 1701; Neuwied
- Died: 9 October 1765 (aged 63); Neuwied
- Military career
- Allegiance: (Kingdom of Prussia) Prussia
- Branch: Army
- Rank: Lieutenant General
- Conflicts: War of Austrian Succession
- Awards: Order of the Black Eagle; Equestrian statue of Frederick the Great

Franz Karl Ludwig von Wied zu Neuwied (19 October 1710 – 9 October 1765, in Neuwied) was a lieutenant general in Frederick the Great's army. He received the Order of the Black Eagle and was proprietor of the 41st Infantry Regiment. His name is inscribed on the Equestrian statue of Frederick the Great.
