= Christoph Karl von Bülow =

- Military career
- Commands: Markgraf von Anspach-Bayreut
- Conflicts: Seven Years' War

Christoph Carl von Bülow (* 26 May 1716 in Glubenstein near Rastenburg, Kingdom of Prussia, 1 July 1788 in Pasewalk) was the Prussian General of the Cavalry, commander of the Dragoons regiment Markgraf von Anspach-Bayreuth, general inspector of the cavalry in Prussia, Knight of the Black Eagle Order, as well as official chief of Memel and Oletzkow. His name is included on the Equestrian statue of Frederick the Great.

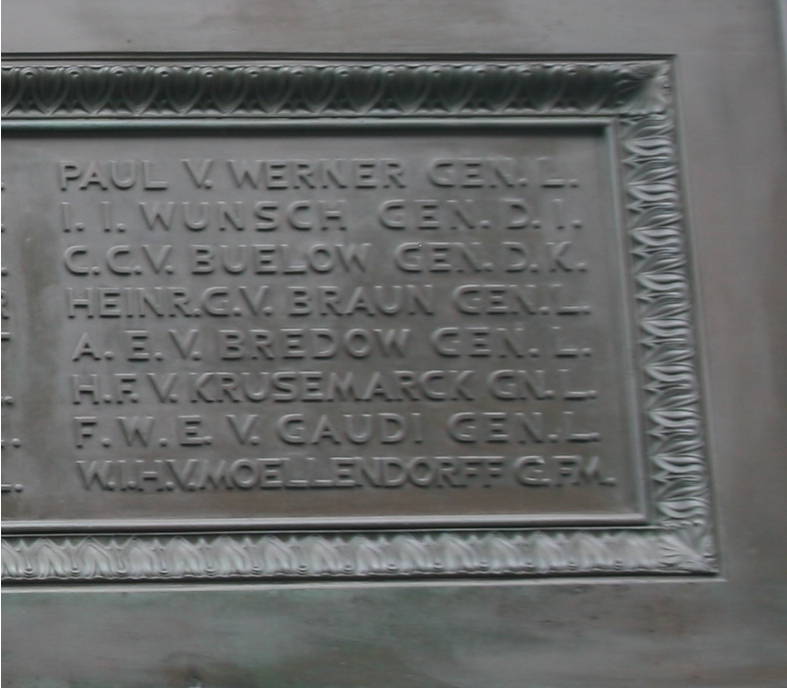
Bülow is memorialized on the Equestrian statue of Frederick the Great

'
