= August Friedrich von Itzenplitz =

- Born: April 1693; Duchy of Cleves
- Died: 28 September 1759 (aged 65–66); Stettin
- Military career
- Allegiance: (Kingdom of Prussia) Prussia
- Branch: Army
- Service years: 1709–1759
- Rank: Lieutenant General

August Friedrich von Itzenplitz (April 1693 – 25 September 1759 in Stettin) was a Prussian lieutenant General during the wars of Frederick the Great. He died of injuries received at the Battle of Kunersdorf. He was the hereditary heir of Hönnepel, Ober- und Nieder-Mörmter in the Duchy of Cleves, and of the property Jerchel in the Altmark. He received the Black Eagle Order and was memorialized on the Equestrian statue of Frederick the Great.
