= Christoph Friedrich von Lattorf =

Christoph Friedrich von Lattorf (7 September 1696 – 3 April 1762 in Kosel) was a lieutenant general in the Prussian army and a Knight of the Black Eagle Order. He served in the Seven Years' War, the War of Austrian Succession, and the War of Polish Succession. He was later appointed as commander of the fortress at Kosel, and as council of the counties of Stettin and Jasenitz.

== Family ==
He was married twice. His first wife, Louise Wilhelmine von der Schulenburg, died in 1743. His second wife was Albertine Wilhelmine Herault von Hatcharmoy (died 31 May 1786), the daughter of the Lieutenant General Heinrich Karl Ludwig de Herault. He had no children.
