= Siegmund Moritz William von Langen =

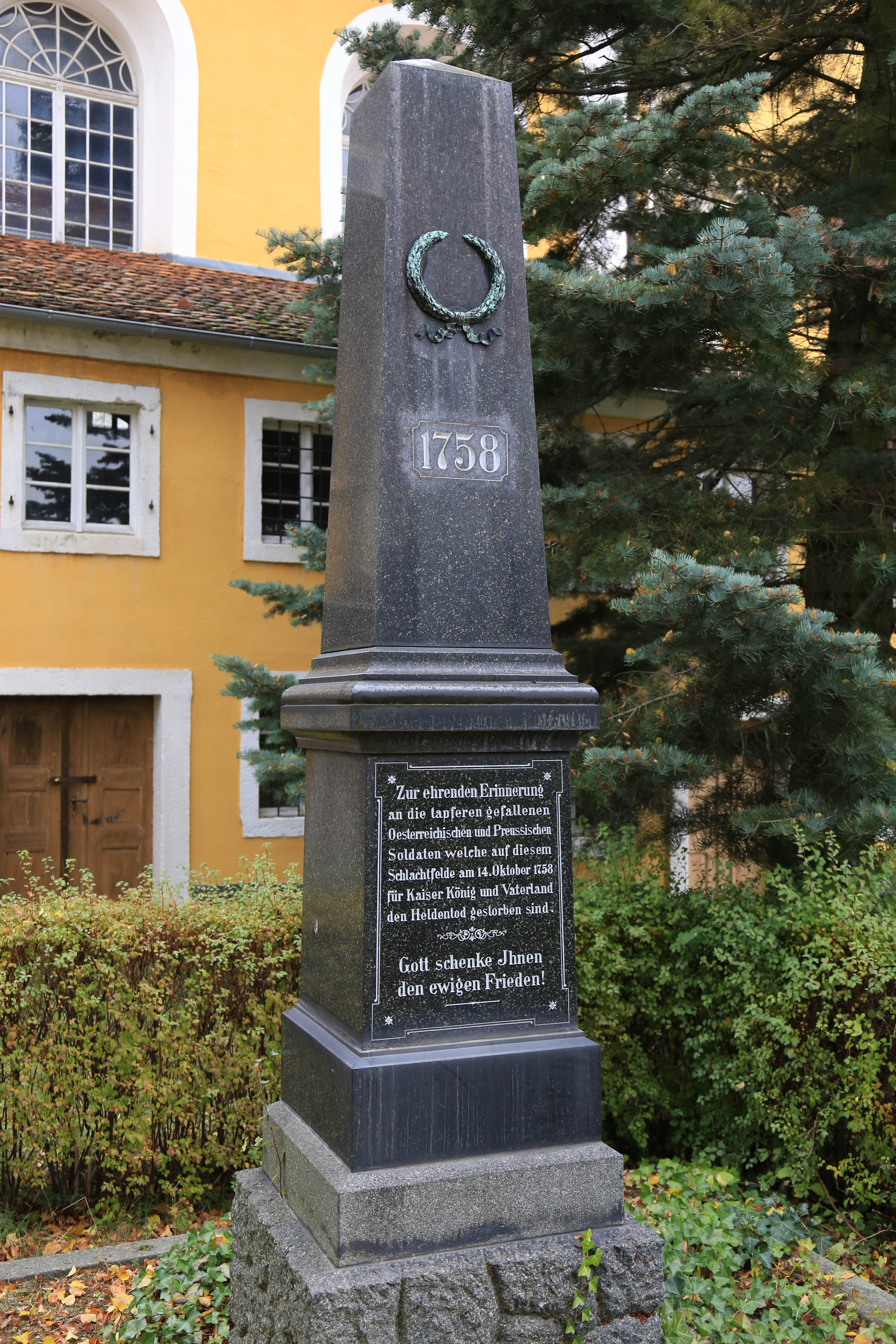
- Hochkirch cemetery
- Born: 1706 or 1708; Westphalia
- Died: 21 October 1758 (48–50 years); Hochkirch
- Military career
- Allegiance: (Kingdom of Prussia) Prussia
- Branch: Army
- Service years: 1724–1758
- Rank: Major
- Conflicts: War of Austrian Succession; Seven Years' War
- Awards: Equestrian statue of Frederick the Great

Siegmund Moritz William von Langen, also called Simon Moritz, ( 1706 or 1708, Westphalia–21 October 1758, Bautzen, Silesia), was a Prussian major of the who died of injuries received in the Hochkirch churchyard during the Battle of Hochkirch, in the Seven Years' War. His actions at Hochkirch delayed the Austrian forces sufficiently for Frederick the Great to organize a retreat. This saved the Prussian army.

== Military career ==
He entered the Prussian military as an 18-year-old, and 1736 was promoted to second lieutenant in the Infantry Regiment Krocher (No. 18). In 1741, he was in the regiment Markgraf Heinrich No. 42, in which he entered into the Seven Years' War. He was wounded at the Battle of Leuthen, but recovered from these wounds. Promoted to major, he served at the Siege of Olmütz.

== Military fame at Hochkirch ==
On 14 October 1758, his name became legendary in Prussian military circles; with 2 battalions of his regiment, he defended the churchyard of Hochkirch against an overwhelming force of Karl O'Donnell's Austrian cavalry. The first battalion defended the larger of the Prussian batteries (10 of the 12 pound cannon) near Hochkirch; the second battalion, commanded by Langen, defended the cemetery of the village against 10 times their number. These two battalions took the brunt of the artillery fire into the village, which included round shot and howitzer fire. The second battalion stood with incredible stubbornness until its cartridges were spent. This afforded the Prussian army sufficient time to organize a counterattack.

Langen was taken prisoner by the Austrians. He died seven days later, on 21 October 1758, in Bautzen, where most of the wounded had been taken. He had been shot at least 11 times, and was buried by the Austrians with great honors and distinction. At the mustering of the regiment a day of the battle, Frederick referred to the brave Major Langen.

Langen is one of the few Prussian officers in a line of generals included on the Equestrian statue of Frederick the Great. In Hochkirch, erected in 1903 between the church tower and the church, is an obelisk engraved with the words: "Major Simon Moritz von Langen geehrt wird, der „diesen Kirchhof mit dem 2. Bataillon des Regiments Markgraf Karl gegen zehnfache Übermacht bis zur Vernichtung seiner Mannschaft verteidigte“. ("Major Simon Moritz of Langen, who defended this cemetery with the 2nd battalion of the regiment Markgraf Karl against ten times his number, up to the destruction of his unit.").

== Family ==
Langen's family originated in Westphalia, near Oldenburg. Its progenitor, Andreas von Langen (*~1468–~ 1555), was lord and master of Schwakenburg. The family remained in the area until the beginning of the 18th century, in Osnabruck and Saxe Gothe; the male line died in the second half of the 18th century.
