= Asmus Ehrenreich von Bredow =

Prussian general (1693–1756)

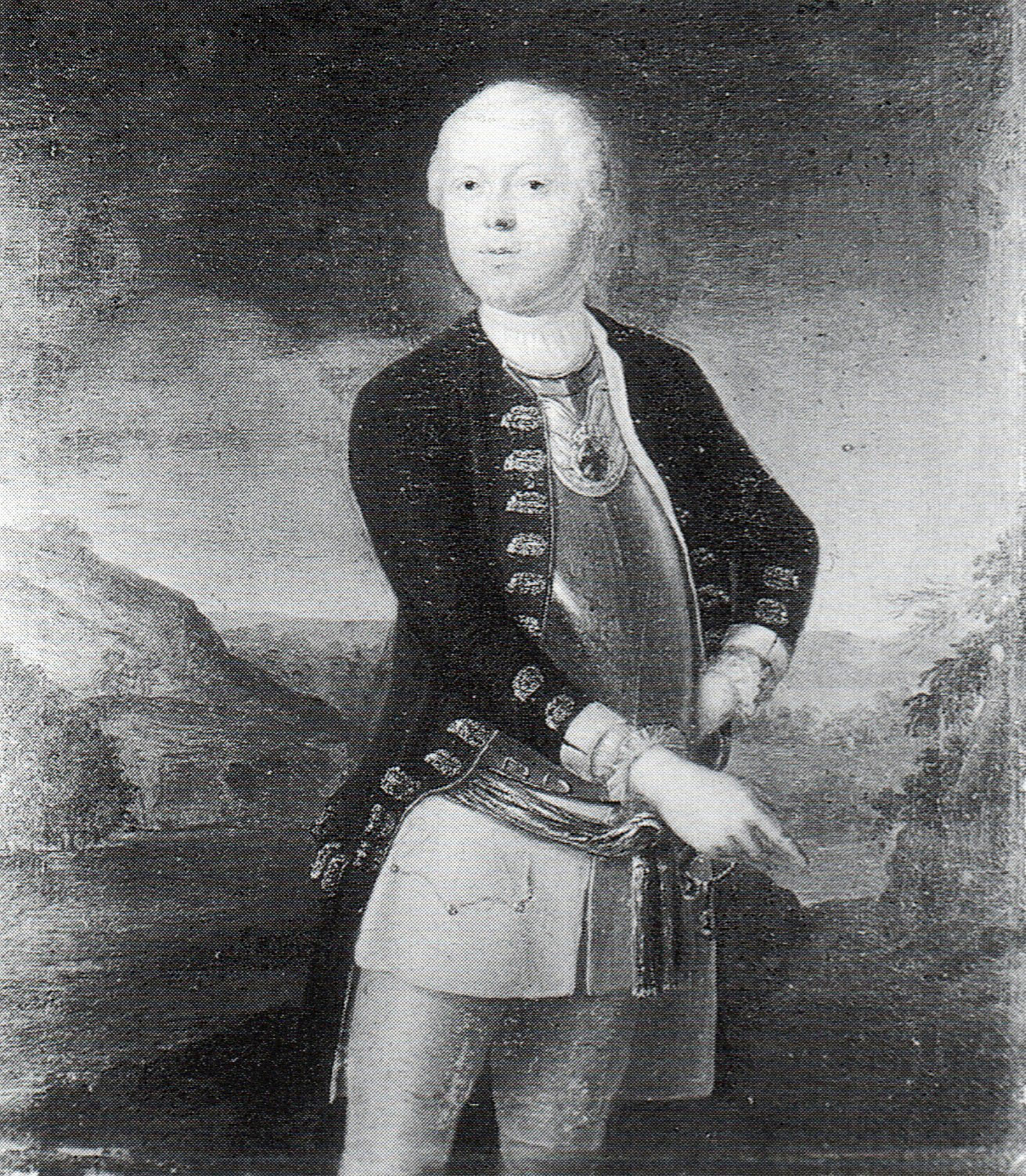

Asmus Ehrenreich von Bredow (29 April 1693 in Senzke (Landkreis Westhavelland)–15 February 1756 in Halberstadt) was a Prussian Lieutenant General and Governor of the fortress at Kolberg. He served in the War of Austrian Succession in Frederick the Great's army. He was a Knight of the Black Eagle Order, hereditary heir of Worin’schen properties in East Prussia, and his name is listed on the Equestrian statue of Frederick the Great in Berlin.
