= Kaspar Ernst von Schultze =

Prussian Army commander

- Born: 18 October 1691; Berlin
- Died: 2 December 1757 (aged 66); Breslau
- Burial place: Breslau
- Military career
- Allegiance: (Kingdom of Prussia) Prussia
- Branch: Army
- Rank: Lieutenant General
- Conflicts: War of the Spanish Succession; Great Northern War; War of the Austrian Succession; Battle of Mollwitz; Seven Years' War; Battle of Breslau
- Awards: inscription on the Equestrian statue of Frederick the Great

Kaspar Ernst von Schultze (also Casper Earnest von Schultze) (18 October 1691 in Berlin – 2 December 1757 in Breslau) was a Lieutenant General of infantry in the Prussian Army, commander of the Breslau fortress, and director of the royal riding academy in Liegnitz. He was also the heir of the family estates at Mahlen (today Wisznia Mała) in the Silesian county of Trebnitz. He fought in the wars of Spanish and Austrian succession, the Great Northern War, and the Seven Years' War. He served in the Prussian army under three monarchs: Frederick I, Frederick William I, and Frederick II. His name was included in 1851 on the Equestrian statue of Frederick the Great honoring the men considered to be the founders of the modern Prussian state.

== Family and character ==
At his birth, his father served in the Prussian military. Schultze was educated at the Joachimsthaler Gymnasium in Berlin and then at the universities of Halle, Jena and Wittenberg. At each he acquired advanced knowledge useful in his military career. He was considered a Renaissance man, much like his king, and spoke Latin, French, Italian and some Spanish. He traveled widely in royal service, and had visited most of the territories of the Holy Roman Empire.

He married in 1728 with Anna Elisabeth Krielen (Kriehl) (1712–14 February 1788) from Brandenburg. They had two surviving children:

- Juliana Beate Sophie (died 1752)
- Christoph Johann (died 1786) ∞ 30 May 1757 Freiin 'Eleonora Sennia Friedrica von Rottwitz

In acknowledgement of his service, he was raised to the nobility with his step brother, Friedrich Böning von Schulze. His brother died in 1786 as a pensioned colonel of the Infantry Regiment No. 5.

== Military career ==
The Chief of the Artillery, Margrave Albert Frederick of Brandenburg-Schwedt noticed his talent, and in 1707 Schultze joined the Artillery corps. There he came to the notice of the future king, Friedrich Wilhelm I, who made him and subaltern in the Life Regiment. With this regiment, he fought in the War of Spanish Succession, especially at the Battle of Malplaquet and in the Siege of Bouchain in 1711.

On 13 January 1714, he was promoted to Fähnrich of the Infantry Regiment No. 2 (Jung-Dönhoff). In the Pomerania campaign of the Great Northern War (1715–1716, he fought at Stralsund and was promoted to lieutenant on 28 January 1716; 3 January 1723, staff captain of Infantry Regiment Nr. 28 (Mosel) and, quickly, on 5 June 1723, he received his own company. On 20 July 1730, he was also named as regional captain for Fischhausen (Prussia). In this position, he recruited 50 officers and more than 4000 soldiers for the Prussian army.

In 1732, the Crown Prince Frederick became his colonel. On 25 July 1738, he was promoted to Major, and, when Frederick formed his own Life Guard Regiment, the Prince named Schultze as lieutenant colonel of the first battalion. With the Life Guards, he fought on 10 April 1741 at the Battle of Mollwitz, where he was wounded by cannon shot and his horse, killed. On 18 May 1743, he was promoted to colonel and received command of the first and second battalions of Frederick's Life Guard. In the Second Silesian war, part of the War of Austrian Succession, he was commander of the fortress at Meissen. On 30 May 1747, he was promoted to major general and made commandant of the Breslau fortress as well as overseer of the Royal Riding Academy in Liegnitz. In the same year he received his own regiment, Infantry Regiment Nr. 29.

With the outbreak of the Seven Years' War, he remained in Breslau, named lieutenant general in March 1757. During the Battle of Breslau on 22 November 1757, he led a brigade into battle and was shot through his left breast, badly wounded. He remained on his horse, leading his troops, until the animal was itself shot. Despite his own injuries, he mounted five additional horses; the horses were all killed and eventually he collapsed. He was carried to the house of Prince Ferdinand in Breslau, and there the ball was extracted, but he died of his wound two weeks later. He was buried at the evangelical church with little fanfare. In 1851, Frederick William IV included his name on the Equestrian statue of Frederick the Great, among the founders of the modern Prussian state.
