= Karl Christoph von der Goltz =

Karl Christoph, Freiherr von der Golz
- Born: 2 December 1707; Dramburg
- Died: 3 June 1761 (aged 53); Zerbau near Groß-Glogau
- Relatives: Karl Alexander
- Military career
- Allegiance: Prussia c. 1702–1710; Hesse c. 1710–? Saxony 1738. Prussia
- Branch: Prussian Army
- Service years: Prussia: 1724–1761
- Rank: Lieutenant General
- Conflicts: First Silesian War; Second Silesian War; Seven Years' War
- Awards: Black Eagle Order; Equestrian statue of Frederick the Great

Karl Christoph Freiherr von der Goltz (2 December 1707 in Heinrichsdorf near Dramburg – 30 June 1761 in Zerbau near Groß-Glogau) was a lieutenant general in the Prussian army during the reign of Frederick the Great.

== Military career ==
Goltz entered legal studies at Thorn from 1716 – 1720. Upon leaving university, for the next three years he worked at the Chancellery, and later for the Crown, but he did not like the legal profession. In 1723, Goltz entered into Prussian military service. At the beginning of 1724, he was a fahnenjunker in the Forcade regiment. In 1726 he went through the Holy Roman Empire on a recruiting tour, with such great success that he was promoted to cadet later that year.

In 1752 he became commander-in-chief and 1757 major general and regimental commander of the infantry regiment No. 24. On 6 February 1760, he was appointed lieutenant general. In March 1760, Frederick wrote to his general, "This is the old Prussian style, to hold themselves successfully against a far more numerous army." Goltz was able to retire in order to Neisse, after Daun defeated the Prussians at Battle of Maxen.

In October 1760, Goltz commanded 16 battalions and 35 squadrons to guard the fortress of Glogau against the Russians. After that he fought with Landshut again against the Austrian general Gideon von Laudon.

On 19 April 1761, Goltz presented an attack plan to the King. The plan was to attack with his 20,000 men from Glogau against the Russian troops. For this purpose, he was provided with the jus gladii (right over life and death) by the king in the headquarters of Hausdorf. On 13 May 1761, Goltz was awarded the Black Eagle Order. In June, however, he fell ill with typhus in the encampment near Glogau, where he died. Goltz was included on the Equestrian statue of Frederick the Great.

== Family ==
He was the second son of the rittmeister (cavalry captain) Henning Bernhard von der Goltz and his wife Maria Katharina von Heidebreck. His elder brother, Henning Bernd von der Goltz, was also a soldier.

Goltz married on 17 July 1737 to Frederike Margaretha von Burgsdorf a widow. ( 13. August 1713– 1773). The couple had 11 children:

- Caroline Ernestine (26 June 1738–8. October 1775) ∞ Dezember 1761 Gustav Ludwig von der Marwitz (1730–1797)
- Karl Alexander von der Goltz (20. August 1739–15. November 1818) Danish lieutenant general and Portuguese field marshal.
- Friedrich Bernhard (29 November 1740– 1741)
- Georg Friedrich (17 September 1742–24. November 1759 in Torgau)
- Charlotte Wilhelmine (23 December 1743–13 September 1792) married Ernst Ludwig von Wedel (18 October 1747– 28 January 1812)
- Johann Heinrich (9. May 1745– December 1745)
- Frederika Luise (12. September 1746– 1779)
- Henriette Auguste (21. February 1749;)
- August Leopold (4 May 1750– 1822) married Jeanette von Kurowski
- Johanna Albertine (13. April 1752)
- Lisette Amalie ( December 1755– 1757)
