= Anton von Krockow =

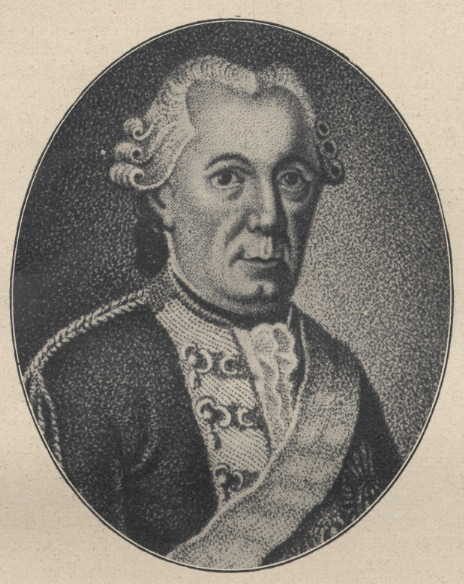
- Born: 4 January 1714; Polzin, Pomerania
- Died: 11 September 1778 (aged 64); Landshut
- Relatives: Wilhelm von Krockow
- Military career
- Allegiance: (Kingdom of Prussia) Prussia
- Branch: Army
- Service years: 1757–1763; 1778: Seven Years' War; War of Bavarian Succession
- Rank: General
- Awards: Black Eagle Order; Equestrian statue of Frederick the Great 1851

Anton Friedrich von Krockow (4 January 1714 – 7 September 1778) was a Prussian lieutenant general.

== Family ==
His parents were Philipp Reinhold von Krockow, a captain in the imperial army and heir of Polzin, and his wife Anna Maria von Borcke. His younger brother, Wilhelm (1719 – 1803), was a Prussian General of Infantry.

Krockow married Auguste Luise Heinriette Freiin von Lüders (d 1790). They had the following children

- Karl Wilhelm (b. 1748), Prussian cadet
- Ludwig Christian Friedrich (b. 1749), Prussian lieutenant
- Karoline Wilhelmine (b.1752)
- Auguste Christiane Friederike (* 1756) married Johann Georg von der Marwitz, a Prussian officer
- Sophie
- Henriette ∞ Ernst Vollrath von Kölichen auf Reisicht

== Military career ==
Krockow had been a corporal since 1728 in the infantry regiment "von Holstein" of the Prussian army. On the recommendation of the Polish king Stanislaus I, he entered French service in 1735 and rose there to colonel of the cavalry. His repeated requests for re-establishment in the Prussian service were not fulfilled until March 1757 by King Frederick, although Krockow was granted a patent of 1 May 1748, as colonel and general adjutant. After the death of the major general Christian Friedrich von Blanckensee, Krockow received his place as head of Blanckensee's former dragoon regiment. During the Seven Years' War, he became lieutenant general. He took part in the battles near Prague, Kolin, Hochkirch, Liegnitz and Torgau. He was wounded at Leuthen. He remained in active service until April 1760.

In June, 1769, the King appointed him the chief officer of Neuenhagen and Freienwalde. On 18 January 1773, Frederick also made Krockow on a knight of the Black Eagle Order. At the beginning of the War of Bavarian Succession, he marched with his regiment from the garrison and died in a stroke in the King's camp. Krokow was included on the Equestrian statue of Frederick the Great.
