= Christoph Ludwig von Stille =

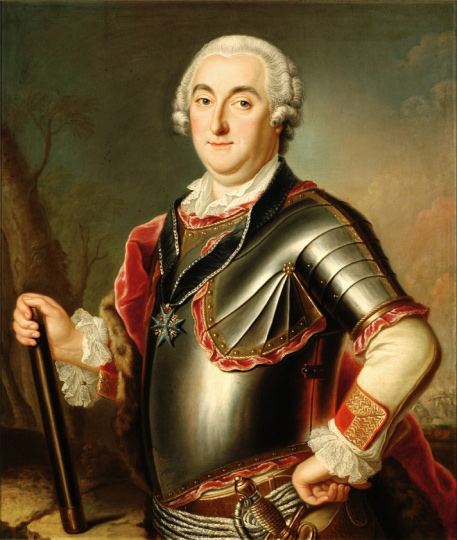
- Born: 13 September 1696; Berlin
- Died: 19 October 1752 (aged 56); Aschersleben
- Military career
- Allegiance: (Kingdom of Prussia) Prussia
- Branch: Army
- Rank: General
- Conflicts: War of Austrian Succession

Christoph Ludwig von Stille (13 September 1696 in Berlin–19 October 1752 in Aschersleben) was a Prussian Major General and curator of the Royal Academy of Science in Berlin. He was the son of the Lieutenant General Ulrich Christoph von Stille.

== Early life ==
Although Christoph Ludwig was born on 18 September 1696 in Berlin, the son of Ulrich Christoph von Stille (1654–1728) and Eva Maria von Cosel; he was one of five boys and one daughter. Ulrich Christoph von Stille was at that time employed in the Savoy. Stille became fluent in the usual languages: besides Latin and French, he also learned English and Italian. In 1709, King Frederick I of Prussia's death, the king promoted the father to the rank of lieutenant general, and made him commander of Magdeburg fortress, where the family was able to live together.

Stille and his brothers received an excellent education in the center of the two universities of the Elbe and Weser. Stille attended the University of Helmstadt and in 1715, he embarked upon a military career in his father's regiment. He was at the siege of Stralsund. On 19 October 1718 he became lieutenant at the Lord's father's regiment. When the circumstances allowed it, he attended the university again, this time the University of Halle. Like his friend, Ewald von Kleist, he worked as a Prussian recruiting officer, especially in Switzerland.

He rose to prominence in the military quickly; in 1740, upon Frederick the Great's ascension to the throne, he came to the king's notice. Frederick, delighted to find a well-educated military man, promoted him to colonel, without first promoting him to lieutenant colonel, and then appointed him as tutor to his younger brother, Henry.

He was a literate and well-educated man. He was a friend of the poets Ludwig Gleim and Ewald von Kleist; he introduced these men to Frederick the Great. Gleim called him among Frederick's best and most charming friends. He himself translated several works, including some by Maupertuis. He wrote a work himself about the Silesian wars. He married in 1729 to Charlotte Sophie von Huss. She was the daughter of the President of Magdeburg, Karl Adolph von Huss. They had 12 children, of which two sons and four daughters survived. Charlotte Sophie's sister was Marie Sybylle von Huss (1699-1767), who married another of Frederick's generals Peter Ludwig du Moulin.
