= Heinrich Gottlob von Braun =

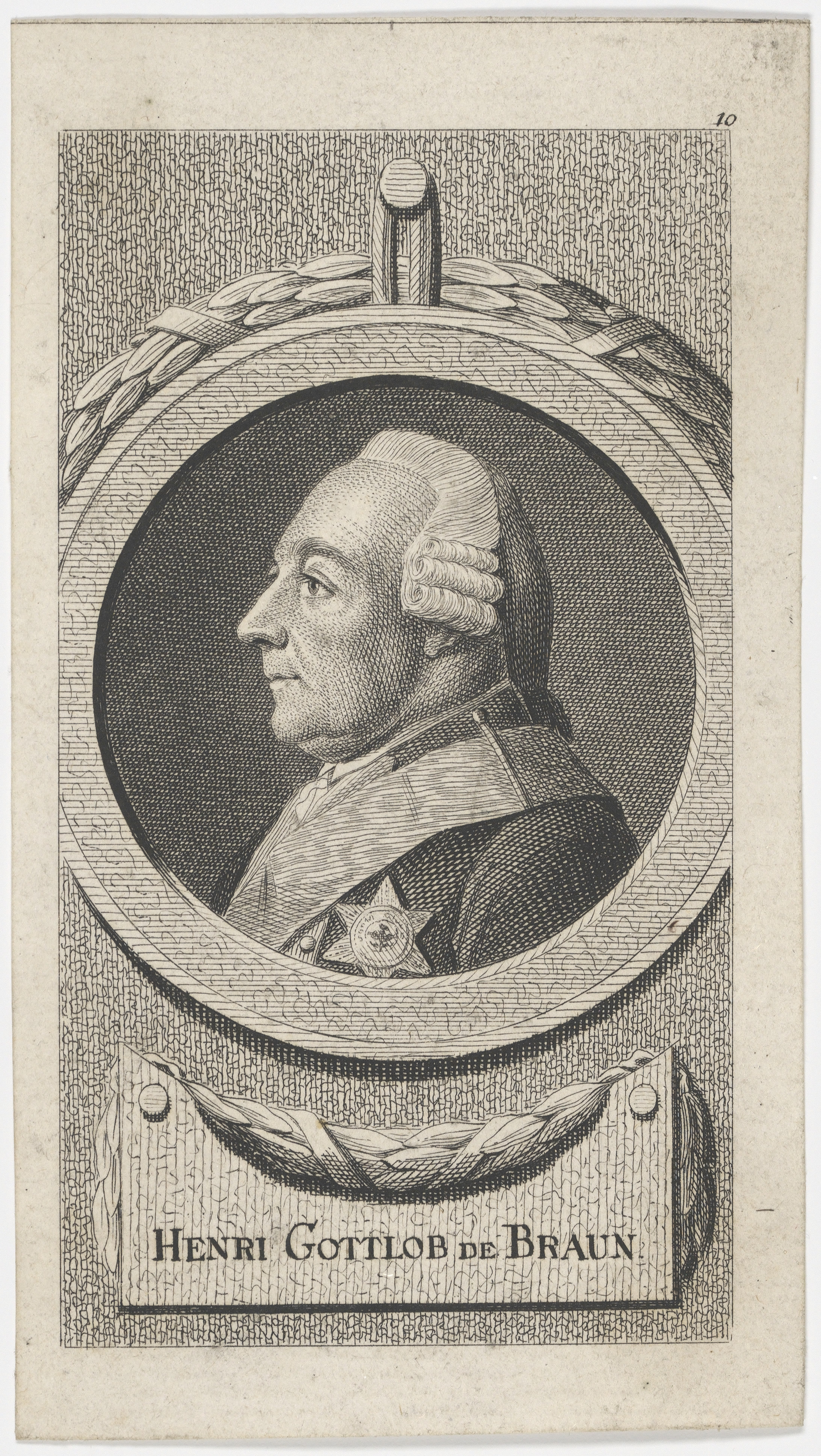
- Portrait of Heinrich Gottlob von Braun
- Born: 25 October 1717; Giersleben
- Died: 24 December 1798 (aged 81)
- Burial place: Berlin
- Military career
- Allegiance: (Kingdom of Prussia) Prussia
- Branch: Army
- Service years: 1735–1761
- Rank: Lieutenant General
- Conflicts: War of Austrian Succession; Battle of Mollwitz; Siege of Prague; Battle of Kesselsdorf; Seven Years' War; Battle of Breslau; Battle of Zorndorf; Battle of Lobositz
- Awards: Order Pour le Mérite; Black Eagle Order; Inscription on the Equestrian statue of Frederick the Great

Heinrich Gottlob von Braun (25 October 1717 (or 1714) in Giersleben – 24 December 1798 in Berlin) was a Prussian general of infantry. He served Frederick the Great during the War of Austrian Succession (First and Second Silesian wars), and received the Order Pour le Mérite and the Black Eagle Order. In 1851, he was also memorialized on the Equestrian statue of Frederick the Great.

== Military career ==
He served as a page at the palace of the Princes of Anhalt-Köthen in 1732. In 1734, he joined as Fähnrich in a newly established battalion, of Anhalt, which was ordered to the imperial army. With this unit, he participated in the Rhineland campaign. In May 1735, he entered Prussian service and was transferred into the foot regiment "Leopold von Anhalt-Dessau". There he was promoted to second lieutenant on 17 September 1738.

With the Grenadier battalion "von Bolster" he fought in the First Silesian War at the storming of Glogau, and also in the Battle of Mollwitz He was promoted to first lieutenant on 24 May 1742. During the Second Silesian war, he participated in the Siege of Prague (1742) and the Battle of Kesselsdorf. On 22 December 1745, he was promoted to staff captain, and subsequently on 19 January 1746 to captain, and received his own company.

In the Seven Years' War he was at the Battle of Lobositz, during which he had been wounded in the arm, and he received the Order Pour le Mérite. At Breslau in 1757, he reinjured his arm; he was promoted to major on 11 January 1758 and fought later that year at the Battle of Zorndorf. After the peace conferences, he was promoted to lieutenant colonel on 20 September 1765, and to colonel on 20 September 1767, at which time he also received command of the infantry regiment „von Stojentin“.

On 18 December 1774, Frederick appointed him as chef of the infantry regiment "Graf von Lottum." on 11 January 1777 was appointed as a major general, and subsequently on 3 June 1781 as commandant of Berlin. On 20 May 1784, he was promoted to lieutenant general, and a day later was named a Knight of Black Eagle Order. He participated in the funeral procession of Frederick the Great. On 1 January 1794, he was named General of the infantry.

He is buried in the garrison church in Berlin, and his name included on the Equestrian statue of Frederick the Great.

== Family ==
Braun was the son of Adam Friedrich von Braun (24 December 1661 in Voigtstedt–7 December 1739), lord of Giersleben und Anhalt-Kothen regional commissioner, and his second wife, Eleonore Sophie, née von Polenz aus dem Hause Ziegra (13. June 1681). His step brother August Wilhelm von Braun (1701–1770) was also a Prussian General.

Braun married in 1748 to Louise von Bornstedt ( 5 July 1728). They had the following children:

- Ludwig Christoph Gustav (21 July 1750 in Stendal– 6 February 1833), Prussian Major married Friederike von Wüsthoff (25 November 1770–26. November 1841)
- Philippine Henriette Dorothea (1. July 1765– 1 August 1834)

- married (1)Ludwig August Wilhelm von Gerlach, Prussian Chamber minister, divorced 27. November 1788
- married (2)Paul Wilhelm Baron von Wilczeck, Herr auf Chudow in Upper Silesia, Canon in Magdeburg, divorced
- married (3) Karl Friedrich August von Gontard, Prussian Major

== Sources ==
- Kurt von Priesdorff: Soldatisches Führertum. Band 2, Hanseatische Verlagsanstalt, Hamburg ohne Jahr, S. 100–101.
- Eduard Lange: Die Soldaten Friedrich’s des Grossen. Leipzig 1853, S. 58, Digitalisat
- Militär-Wochenblatt|Militair-Wochenblatt. Band 23, Nr. 27, 7. Juli 1838, S. 109, Digitalisat
