= Peter von Pennavaire =

Prussian cavalry lieutenant general (1680–1759)

Peter Ernst von Pennavaire
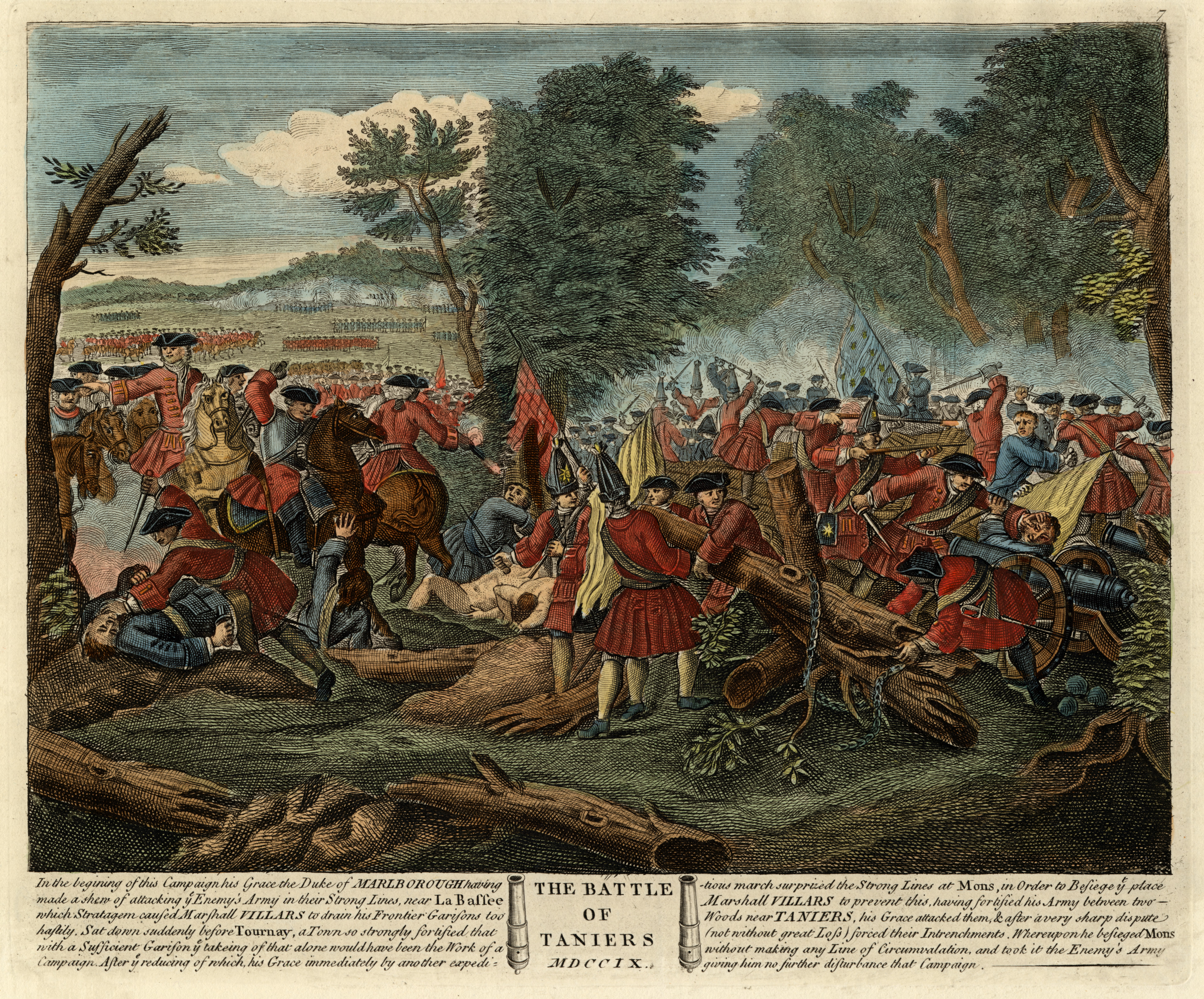
- Pennavaire's first major engagement at Malplaquet
- Born: 1680; Toulouse, Languedoc, France
- Died: 19 January 1759 (aged 78–79); Berlin, Prussia
- Military career
- Allegiance: Kingdom of Prussia
- Branch: Prussian Army
- Service years: 1709–1759
- Rank: Lieutenant General
- Conflicts: War of Spanish Succession; War of Polish Succession; War of the Austrian Succession; Seven Years' War
- Awards: Pour le Mérite; Black Eagle Order; Name inscribed on Frederick the Great's Equestrian Statue

Peter Ernst von Pennavaire (born 1678 or 1680; died 19 January 1759) was the son of a French advocate (attorney) in Toulouse who fled France in about 1685. He served in the Prussian army, achieving the rank of lieutenant general of cavalry and proprietor of the Leib-Carabiniers (Cürassier-Regiment No 11). He was the recipient of the Black Eagle Order and Pour le Mérite. At age 80, he led his cavalry in a charge at the Battle of Breslau at the Austrian front, and died of complications from injuries he received there.

== Family ==
The Pennavaire family originated in Guyenne, France; Pierre de Pennavaire from Saint-Antonin-Noble-Val (died 1711 in Berlin) was an advocate (attorney) in Toulouse. After the Edict of Fontainebleau (1685) (also called the revocation of the Edict of Nantes), he fled with his four sons to the safety of Protestant Berlin.

Peter von Pennavaire, sometimes called Pierre (II), was probably born in Toulouse or Guyenne 6 August 1680. He married Margaretha Rey, from an Erlanger patriarchal and merchant family. The pair had several children; one of the sons died in the War of Austrian Succession. The daughter, Renata Margarethe (21 July 1730– 2 February 1795) married in 1747 to Colonel Stephan Gottlieb von Dewitz (23 July 1723–1787), a son of Lieutenant General Friedrich Wilhelm von Dewitz.

Pennavaire's older brother, Johann Jakob von Pennavaire, also called Jean Jacques (21 Jan 1678–5 Feb 1750), was also in Prussian military service and first served in the Dragoon Regiment Derfflinger. Pennavaire's son, also Johann Jakob, fought in the War of Austrian Succession, probably in his uncle's regiment, and died as a Rittmeister in 1741. His brother retired as a full Colonel on 4 February 1741 after having commanded the Schulenburg Dragoon Regiment.

== Military service ==
Pennavaire entered into Brandenburg military service in 1694, as a Grand Musketeer, and fought in the War of Spanish Succession, and fought in the Battle of Malplaquet. In December 1712, he was promoted to lieutenant of the Cavalry Horse Guards. In Prussia, he fought in the Pomeranian campaign of the Great Northern War from 1715–1716. On 21 December, he was promoted to Rittmeister; in 1733, he was promoted to major, 1741, to lieutenant colonel, and 1744 to colonel. In the mid-1730s he built a mansion in Berlin, later occupied by Prince Ferdinand of Prussia (later Wilhelmstrasse 65).

In June 1747, Pennavaire was awarded the Pour le Mérite. After serving in the Second Silesian War (the latter half of the War of Austrian Succession, on 14 July 1748 he was promoted to major general. On 14 November 1751, he was named the proprietor of the Cürassier Regiment Nr. 11, also known as the Leibcarabinier Regiment. He succeeded the former chief, Caspar Ludwig von Bredow.

=== Seven Years' War ===
In September 1756, Pennavaire entered the Seven Years War as a major general in Field Marshal James Keith's column, commanding five squadrons each of the Gens d'Armes and Prince of Prussia Cuirassiers. By early October 1756, at Lobositz, Pennavaire's cavalry brigade had been augmented with another squadron of the Garde du Corps (178 men), giving him a brigade of just under 2000. At 11:00, with the field still shrouded in mist, Pennavaire's troopers were sent to reconnoiter the Austrian line, supported by the Bayreuth Dragoons. Quickly, though, the reconnaissance turned into a firefight as the right flank of cuirassiers was enfiladed by the fire of the Austrian occupying Sullowitz. Several squadrons of Austrian dragoons also charged, and Pennavaire's most forward troops were rescued by the Bayreuth dragoons. Subsequently, Frederick pulled the cavalry out of the battle, but they had served a purpose: Frederick knew where his opponent's strengths lay. The battle lasted another seven hours, but Pennavaire and his brigade were observers. In the course of the first moments of battle, the brigade overthrew two Austrian cavalry regiments, took three standards and captured Austrian field marshal Fürst Lobkowitz.

In February 1757, Pennavaire was received as a Knight in the Black Eagle Order. Pennavaire was promoted to lieutenant general on 18 June 1757. In the Battle of Kolin, Frederick's plan fell short of success when he attacked the Austrian front, rather than its wing. Pennavaire commanded cavalry in the center of the Prussian line, including 10 squadrons of cuirassiers. Frederick ordered several cavalry attacks in the course of trying to retrieve the battle. Pennavaire, augmented with another 10 squadrons of horse, was instructed to assault the Krzeczor Heights, supported by Zieten's cavalry and some infantry. Zieten's cavalry had problems of its own and the Duke of Bevern's infantry was already engaged. Pennavaire's men were thrown back. Historian Christopher Duffy noted that Pennavaire's cavalry performed poorly at Kolin and that the general was nicknamed "The Anvil" because he was beaten so often.

At the Battle of Breslau, the 80-year-old lieutenant general led his brigade in a charge on the Austrian crossing the Lohe river at Klein Mochbern. They were heavily strafed by Austrian grape shot and canister fire. He was badly wounded and although he recovered, he did not serve again.

Pennavaire died of pneumonia in Berlin in the night of 18–19 January 1759. Joachim Christian von Bandemer succeeded him as proprietor of the regiment. Pennavaire was buried in the garrison cemetery of Berlin. His brother's son inherited his properties, Heiligenthal at Mansfeld; he had already sold the position of Drostei at Esens in East Friesland, given to him by Frederick, to Wilhelm Ferdinand Thilo zu Stechow in 1749. The last of the family, retired Colonel (Oberst a.D.) von Pennavaire, died in 1824. He had served in the Nieder-Schliesen Fusiliers in 1806 at the fortress of Glogau.

For his service, Pennavaire's name was immortalized in 1851 on one of the honorary plates on the Equestrian statue of Frederick the Great.

Military offices
Preceded by Caspar Ludwig von Bredow	Proprietor of Leib-Carabiniers (Cürassier-Regiment Nr. 11); 1751–1759	Succeeded by Joachim Christian von Bandemer
