= Hans-Friedrich von Krusemark =

Hans-Friedrich von Krusemark, sometimes spelled Krusemarck, (14 June 1720 in Krusemark in der Altmark–15 May 1775 in Berlin) was a Lieutenant General in the Prussian Army of Frederick the Great.

Hans-Friedrich was the son of Adam Andreas von Krusemark (1685–1744) and his wife Sophie Elizabeth von Lüderitz (1701–1765). His father was a captain and also a council of the Altmark and master of Krusemark. Krusemark married Christiane Johanna Wilhelmine von Ingersleben in December 1765. His son, Friedrich Wilhelm Ludwig (9 April 1767 in Berlin– 25. April 1822 in Vienna) was a major general and ambassador, and his daughter, Wilhelmine Caroline Albertine Charlotte Elisabeth (28 April 1768 in Potsdam–22 March 1847 in Berlin) married Count von Reede und wurde chief lady in waiting of the Elizabeth, Crown princess of Prussia.
