= Heinrich Karl Ludwig de Herault =

Heinrich Karl Ludwig de Herault, Seigneur de Hautcharmoy
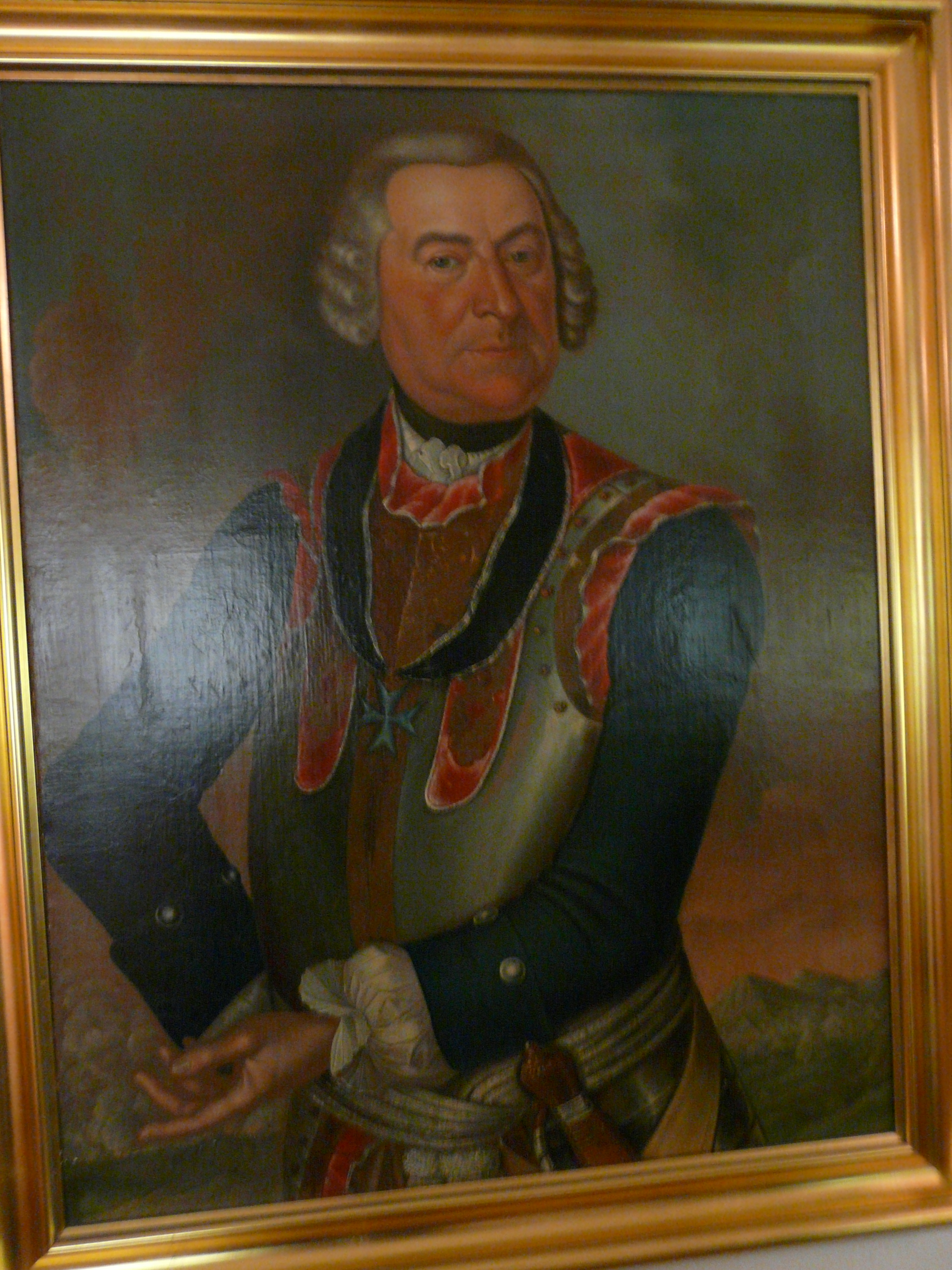
- Born: 1689; Wesel
- Died: 11 May 1757 (aged 67–68); Prague
- Military career
- Allegiance: (Kingdom of Prussia) Prussia
- Branch: Army
- Rank: General
- Conflicts: War of Austrian Succession
- Awards: Order of the Black Eagle; Equestrian Statue of Frederick the Great

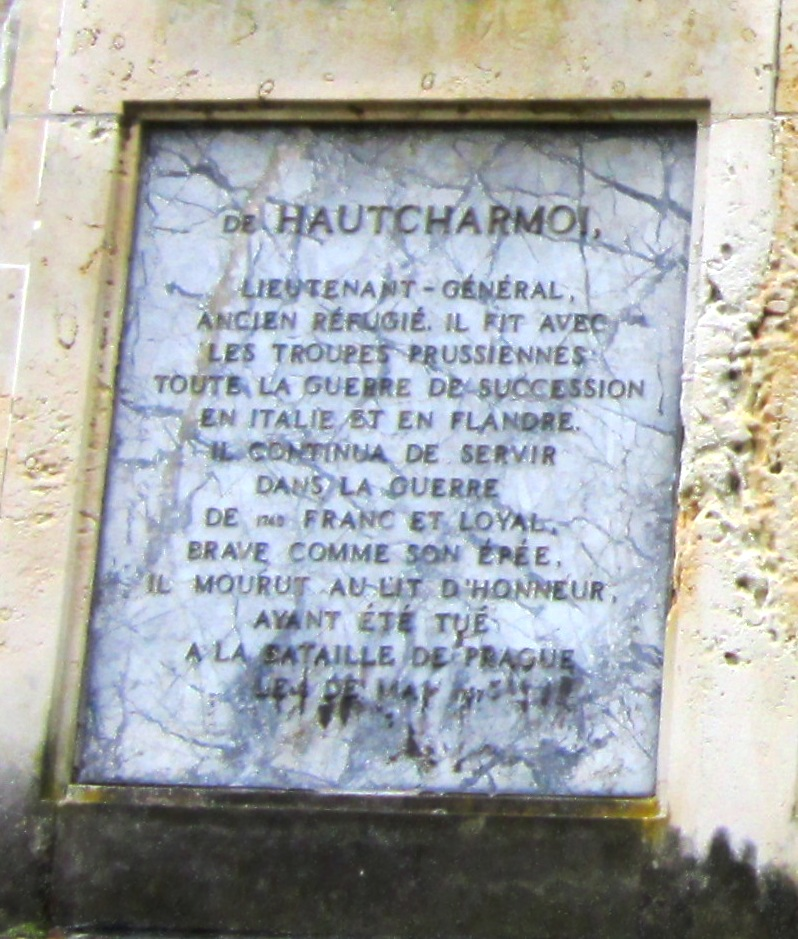
Honors tablet

Heinrich Karl Ludwig de Herault Seigneur de Hautcharmoy (1689 in Wesel – 11 May 1757 in Margaret monastery at Prague) was a Prussian Lieutenant-General, Knight of the Black Eagle and commander of Brieg. His family was originally from Kingdom of France, and his father served as subordinate to Friedrich von Schomberg, and was killed with him at the Battle of the Boyne.

== Biography ==
After a difficult childhood, he entered the Berlin Cadet Corps around 1706. He was part of a Prussian contingent of 8,000 troops in the War of Spanish Succession. He fought as an infantryman in Italy during the relief of Turin, Milan, the siege of Toulon, the conquest of Susa, in the Battle of Calcinato and the storming of Capri.

From 1708 to 1711 he was in the Netherlands. He fought in the Siege of Lille (Ryssel) and Ghent. In January 1709, he was recruited as a cadet in the battalion of the Heyden. On 20 September he was given the task of an engineer (Conductuer). In 1709, he was at the capture of Tournai (Tournay), the Battle of Malplaquet, and thereby the capture of Mons. In 1710 he fought at Douai and Aire and 1711 at Bouchain. On 20 April 1711 he became a Second Lieutenant.

1713 brought in Leopold of Anhalt-Dessau in the Infantry Regiment. On 26 November 1715, he reached First Lieutenant. In the Pomeranian campaign of 1715/1716, he was part of the Siege of Stralsund and the landing at Rügen. There he served as an adjutant. On 17 November 1717, he was promoted to Staff Captain, and on 24 December 1718 he became captain and commander of a company. On 18 November 1726, he became a colonel police constable, succeeding Lieutenant Colonel Brandt in Magdeburg. On 14 April 1730, he was a Quartermaster General Lieutenant. On 22 April he became the official captain of Angerburg.

In August 1738, he was promoted to Lieutenant Colonel and took over the command of Joachim Ernst von Zimmernow. As early as 1740, he took over Infantry Regiment No. 26 (Kleist). In the first of the Silesian Wars, he joined the Battle of Ottmachau in which he occupied and held a strategically important bridge over the Neisse. In the Battle of Mollwitz, he was wounded. On 5 June 1741, he became a colonel and Brigade commander. On 30 January 1742 he took over Infantry Regiment No. 28 and on 27 May 1743 was promoted to Major General. In 1744, he fought under General Karl Heinrich von der Marwitz in Upper Silesia and was on 5 September 1744, victorious over the fortress of Cosel. On 8 September 1753, he was promoted to lieutenant general, and he also received the Black Eagle.

Frederick the Great rewarded his service after the Silesian wars, conferring a prebend (administrative position in a cathedral) in 1746, in Kalkar. In 1748 he received extra pay of 600 dollars. In 1752, he received a Silesian estate.

== Death ==
In the Seven Years' War, during the Battle of Prague, he was mortally wounded and unhorsed. He was taken to the Margaret Monastery near Prague, where he died 11 days after the battle of his wounds. He was also buried there.

For his work, his name was inscribed in 1851 on one of the plaques on the base of the equestrian statue of Frederick the Great.
