= Joachim Christoph von Jeetze =

German field marshal (1673–1752)

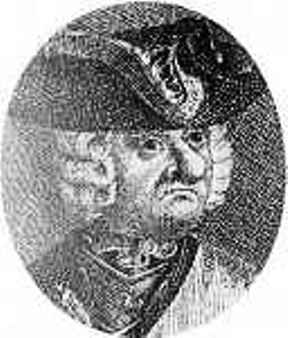
Joachim Christoph von Jeetze

Joachim Christoph Friedrich von Jeetze (16 September 1673 in Hohenwulsch in der Altmark– 11 September 1752 in Potsdam) was the Field Marshal of Frederick the Great.

Joachim Christoph Friedrich was the son of Joachim Parum von Jeetze (died 9 February 1709 in Büste) and his wife, Dorothea Elisabeth (née von Vinzelberg) (2 May 1650– 1 February 1692).

On 13. Mai 1708 Jeetze married Dorothea Sophie von Borstell (18 June 1689 in Groß Schwarzlosen–28 May 1759 in Stendal). They had 4 sons and 2 daughters, one of whom died in infancy. The sons were all soldiers.

- Philipp Wilhelm ( 27 February 1709 in Groß Schwarzlosen; † 28 May 1759), Prussian captain.
- Karl Wilhelm (1 July 1710 in Manuta; † 7 May 1753 in Berlin), Prussian colonel ∞ Sophia Dorothea von Einsiedel, daughter of Gottfried Emanuel von Einsiedel
- Friedrich Wilhelm (* 24 November 1711 in St. Crossete bei Parma; † 18 March 1776 in Stendal), captain ∞ 27 January *Sophie von Hake aus dem Hause Großkreutz († 10 January 1806)
- Wilhelm Leopold (* 7 May 1717 auf Hohenwulsch; † 1722)
- Sophia Hedwig (* 6 March 1714; † a few days later)
