= Peter Ludwig du Moulin =

Prussian general of infantry

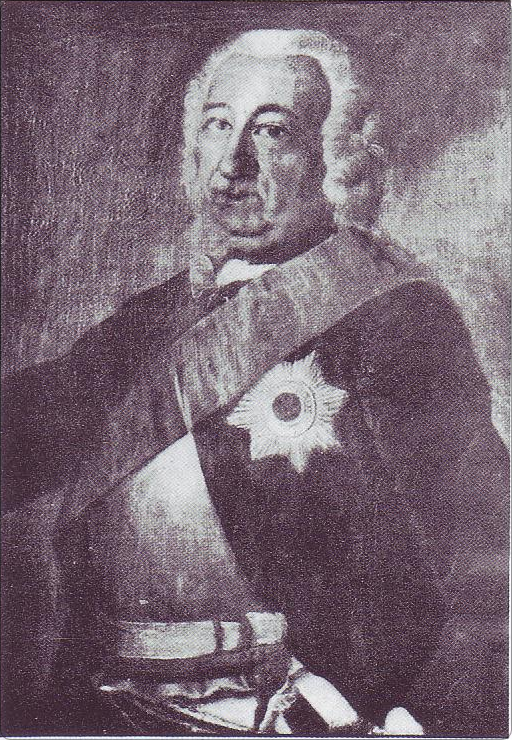
- Born: 1681; Wesel
- Died: 10 August 1756 (aged 74–75) Stendal
- Allegiance: Kingdom of Prussia
- Branch: Prussian Army
- Service years: 1695–1750
- Rank: Lieutenant General
- Conflicts: War of Spanish Succession; Great Northern War; War of the Austrian Succession
- Awards: Order of the Black Eagle; Pour le Mérite; Name inscribed on Frederick the Great's Equestrian Statue

Peter Ludwig du Moulin (1681, in Wesel – 10 August 1756, in Stendal) was a Prussian General of Infantry and served Frederick the Great during the War of Austrian Succession (1740–1748). He served three Prussian kings, including Frederick, Frederick William I, and Frederick I, and fought in the major Prussian wars of the first half of the eighteenth century. During 1730–1731, he was quartermaster of the Prussian field armies. From 1741 to 1755, he was proprietor of the Infantry Regiment Nr. 37.

== Military career ==
Peter Ludwig du Moulin was the son of the Huguenot Theophil du Moulin, who, since 1681, had served in the Brandenburg military. When he was 14 years old, Peter Ludwig entered as Fahnenjunker in the Infantry Regiment Prince Leopold von Anhalt-Dessau (Nr. 3). In 1703, he was promoted to Fähnrich (cadet). During the War of Spanish Succession (1701–1714), he participated in the First Battle of Höchstädt in 1703, and, subsequently, the Battle of Blenheim a year later. He was present at the battles of Cassano in 1705 and Turin in 1706. After 6 December 1707, he was promoted to staff captain, and assigned to the Prussian Crown Prince, Frederick William at the Battle of Malplaquet in 1709. Afterward, he participated in campaigns in the Great Northern War. In summer 1712 he was promoted to captain of his own company, and in December 1715, he was promoted to major of the newly established Infantry Regiment Prince Leopold von Anhalt-Dessau (Nr. 27), in Stendal.

On 16 March 1722, Moulin was promoted to lieutenant colonel and subsequently, on 26 October 1728, to colonel. When the Prussian troops were mobilized in 1729 for an imminent war over Polish succession, Frederick William, now king, appointed Moulin as quartermaster of the field armies. He was also sent to The Hague as a special envoy in 1732, and on 21 July 1735, he was given command of his own regiment.

Shortly before the beginning of the War of Austrian Succession (1740–1748), the new king, Frederick, sent Moulin to Vienna explore the situation with Austria. Consequently, he was not with the troops at the outbreak of war, but returned to the Prussian army to take part in the Battle of Mollwitz on 10 April 1741. He was promoted to major general on 5 June, and on 25 June he became the proprietor of the Infantry Regiment Nr. 37, garrisoned in Breslau. The previous proprietor was Paul Heinrich Tilio de Camas. In 1742, Moulin covered the rear of the army during the Battle of Chotusitz and then became commander-in-chief of the fortress at Glogau. In gratitude for his services, he received the municipal office of Raden at Rinteln, in addition to that of Kolbatz, which he had held since 1731.

On the second invasion of Bohemia, Moulin's regiment was part of the first corps, which, during the summer of 1744, laid a successful siege to Prague. On 14 November 1744, he was promoted to the rank of lieutenant general. On 1 May 1745, the King, with the command of a corps of 10 grenadier battalions and 40 squadrons of cavalry, ordered him to protect Bohemian mountain passes. He evaded the main Austrian army and joined the Prussian main army in time for the Battle of Hohenfriedberg on 4 June 1745. Subsequently, he was received as a Knight of the Black Eagle Order.

At the conclusion of the war, Moulin received an estate in Anhalt as a gift. On 19 May 1750 he was promoted to the General of the infantry. On 12 September, on account of his poor health, the general finally asked the King for his release from the military service. Upon his retirement in 1755, Heinrich Adolf von Kurssel became proprietor of Infantry Regiment Nr. 37. On 10 August 1756, Moulin died after a long illness in Stendal. The family coat of arms can still be seen today at his house.

== Family ==
He married Marie Sibylle von Huss (1699–1768), daughter of the city president of Magdeburg, Karl Adolf von Huss, on 19 July 1717, with whom he had two daughters and three sons (two of whom later fell as officers). His eldest son, Friedrich Wilhelm du Moulin, was the chief of the Regiment Wiedersheim.

Military offices
Preceded by Paul Heinrich Tilio de Camas	Proprietor of Infantry Regiment Nr. 37; 1741–1755	Succeeded by Heinrich Adolf von Kurssel
