= Charles Audé-de-Sion =

Savoyard monk and soldier (1758-1837)

Charles Osipovich Ode-de-Sion
- Charles-Marie-Joseph-Joachim Audé
- Born: Charles-Marie-Joseph-Joachim Audé; August 23, 1758; Faverges, Duchy of Savoy
- Died: January 17, 1837 (aged 78) (some sources give 5 January); Saint Petersburg, Russian Empire
- Relatives: Field Marshal Alexander Suvorov (acquaintance/service connection); Ober-Stallmeister Count Nikolai Zubov (connection)
- Military career
- Allegiance: Kingdom of France (1779); Kingdom of Prussia (1782); Polish–Lithuanian Commonwealth (1783–1790); Russian Empire (1791–1827)
- Branch: Cavalry; Infantry
- Service years: 1779–1827
- Rank: Major general (retired)
- Nicknames: Sion; Chevalier du Fort de Sion; Knight of the Fortress of Sion
- Units: Kingdom of France Régiment d'Alsace (1779); Kingdom of Prussia Unknown Prussian hussar regiment (1782); Polish–Lithuanian Commonwealth Unknown Crown Army regiment (1783–1790); Russian Empire Elisavetgrad Horse-Jäger Regiment (1791–1796); Russian Empire Elisavetgrad Hussar Regiment (1801–1802); Russian Empire Old Ingermanland Infantry Regiment (1802–1827)
- Conflicts: Warsaw Matins (likely involvement in Polish period events)
- Awards: Order of St. George, 4th class (25 years service); Order of St. Vladimir, 4th class; Pour le Mérite
- Other work: Military pensioner, landowner

Charles Osipovich Ode-de-Sion (French: Audé-de-Sion; born Charles-Marie-Joseph-Joachim Audé, or shortly Charles Audé; 23 August 1758, Faverges, Duchy of Savoy, Kingdom of Sardinia – 5 January 1837, Saint Petersburg, Russian Empire) was a Savoyard Benedictine monk and military serviceman; in Russian service — major general, military pedagogue, a prominent freemason of the highest degrees of initiation. Landowner and founder of the Russian noble family Ode-de-Sion.

During his early years, he exchanged monastic vows for military service, swearing oaths to several European sovereigns — including the French, Prussian, and Polish crowns — through which he attained a Doctor of Theology degree in the ecclesiastical sphere and the rank of captain in the military. Upon entering Russian service, he was posted to Warsaw as an officer on special assignments under the Commander-in-Chief of Russian forces in Lithuania and Poland, General of Infantry Count Osip Igelström. He distinguished himself in engagements against Polish insurgents during the Kościuszko Uprising.

He was the tutor of Arkadi, the son of the great commander Count Alexander Suvorov. Enjoying the latter's trust, he participated in the financial machinations of his son-in-law Count Nikolai Zubov. From a private tutor, he advanced under Alexander I to the position of inspector of classes at the Page Corps, to which he devoted 25 years.

After the initiation into the free masons brotherhood in Poland and Savoy at the end of the 18th century, he reached the highest degrees and became a prominent figure in the "golden age" of Freemasonry in Russia (1802–1822). Co-founder and Worshipful Master of the lodge "United Friends" in Saint Petersburg, member of a number of other lodges and higher Masonic organizations.

== Names ==
He was baptized as Charles-Marie-Joseph-Joachim Audé (French: Charles-Marie-Joseph-Joachim Audé), or briefly — Charles Audé. In monastic life, he bore the name Dom Joachim (French: Dom Joachim), but upon entering Russian service, he adopted the name Charles Osipovich Ode-de-Sion. According to his biographer, the French historian Dr. Michel Francou, in order to give the merchant surname Audé a more aristocratic ring, he "borrowed" the prefix from his distant Savoyard relatives, the barons de Sion (French: baron de Sion), who from 1276 owned the eponymous château (French: Château de Sion) and a small parish in the vicinity of Annecy (now part of the commune Val-de-Fier). It is also possible that such a surname was a kind of allusion to Charles Osipovich's Masonic nickname — Chevalier du Fort de Sion (French: Chevalier du Fort de Sion). In private correspondence and some official documents, his Russian surname appears in abbreviated form — Sion.

== Origin ==
Charles Audé came from the "Annecy-Faverges" branch of the ancient Savoyard family Audé. Although some Russian sources erroneously describe him as Swiss or French, his official biography confirms his Savoyard origin.

His ancestors settled in Annecy from 1628, initially trading in spices before switching to iron goods — mainly weapons — and acquiring several forges and mines in the vicinity. In 1715 the family purchased the notarial patent of nearby Faverges and relocated there, retaining their Annecy home and part of their forge operations. The position passed from father to eldest son until 1786.

Despite their low origin, the family's wealth and influence secured them a prominent place in Savoyard society, and impoverished noble houses willingly intermarried with them. Charles's second cousin once removed, Philibert de La Diat, married the nobleman Prosper-Antoine de Sion; his paternal grandmother, Claudine Cochet, was a second cousin of mathematician and Sorbonne rector Jean Cochet (1698–1771); and his mother, demoiselle (Note: Demoiselle from French — "young lady, maiden" — an outdated form of address for a woman of noble birth.) Marie-Thérèse, née Favre (1710–?), was the full sister of François Favre, marquis de Thônes. Thus, while not noble by estate, Charles Audé was of noble blood.

== Biography ==
=== Birth and early years ===
According to Savoyard sources, Charles Audé was born on August 23, 1758, in his parents' house in Faverges. Russian sources do not report the place of birth, and the dates vary: according to the Russian Biographical Dictionary, he was born in 1753 (in the Petersburg Necropolis — August 1, 1753), while his 1817 service record states his age at the time of compilation as 56 years old. He was the eighth of 16 children (five died in infancy) in the family of Joseph-Philibert Audé (1715–1786) and Marie-Thérèse. His godparents were his brother and sister — Charles-Joseph-Joachim (1726–1787), Marquis of Faverges, and Marie-Claudine Millet de Monthoux du Barrioz. His father —the last representative of a dynasty of notaries— held his position until his death and owned a substantial fortune, including town houses in Annecy and Faverges, as well as numerous estates in the surrounding area, where Charles Audé spent his childhood and adolescence. He received a home education solid enough to later demonstrate outstanding success in theological studies.

=== Monk and soldier (1774–1785) ===
On May 12, 1774, fifteen-year-old Charles Audé was tonsured at the Benedictine Talloires Abbey near Annecy under the name Dom Joachim. His father assigned him a pension ensuring a comfortable monastic life; as one monastic vow required renunciation of personal property, this also conveniently excluded him from inheritance. The practice was common in the family — his paternal uncle had been tonsured at Talloires in 1745, and his younger brother Michel (1764–1840) served as a parish priest. From Talloires, Dom Joachim was sent to study at Monte Cassino, where he earned a doctorate in theology at age 18.

His monastic career was marked by repeated flight and repentance. He first fled in February 1777, was subjected to penance upon return, and fled again in February 1779 — stealing the abbot's horse during Annecy's carnival. He eventually enlisted as a common soldier in the Alsace Regiment at Landau, where he attracted the patronage of its colonel, Prince Maximilian de Deux-Ponts-Birkenfeld, the future King of Bavaria. After securing his discharge through intermediaries in August 1779, he walked some 500 km back to Talloires, submitted to further penance, and remained there at least until late 1781.

He soon fled again, this time enlisting as a hussar in the Prussian Army, and deserted and headed to Danzig intending to join volunteers for the Great Siege of Gibraltar, only to find on arrival that the siege had ended. Stranded in a foreign country, he appealed to a local priest in Latin, who arranged his passage to the Benedictine monastery in Lublin. There, on January 27, 1783, he wrote to the Talloires abbot requesting permission to take holy orders in Lublin, but was refused. This finally ended his ecclesiastical ambitions, and he soon left monastic life permanently. His release from monastic vows was formalized by a papal bull, legalized on June 16, 1785.

=== Officer of the Crown Army (1783–1790) ===
Charles joined the Crown Army of the Kingdom of Poland as an officer in Poznań in 1783. In 1786, on leave, he went to Annecy to attend the reading of his recently deceased father's will, which included movable and immovable property and about 40,000 livre tournois in cash. (Note: after the monetary reform of Charles Alexandre de Calonne on October 30, 1785, the precious metal content in the livre tournois was 0.29 grams of pure gold and 4.45 grams of pure silver.) Having learned shortly before death of his son's secularization, Joseph-Philibert Audé reinstated him among the heirs, much to the displeasure of other relatives. All claimants could only be gathered in Annecy by April 2, 1787, and the will was read in the Audé family home on Rue Filaterie. His brothers Michel and François didn't want to accept him back into the family, and insisted he cede his share to them for 6,000 livres with a notarized commitment to renounce all claims forever. This visit to Savoy and meeting with relatives was his last. From Annecy Charles Audé returned to service in the Polish Crown in Poznań.

=== Russian citizen (since 1791) ===
On January 1, 1791, under the name Charles Osipovich Ode-de-Sion, Charles Audé was accepted into Russian service from Prussian in his former rank of captain and assigned to the Elisavetgrad Horse-Jäger Regiment. The son of bourgeois Joseph-Philibert Audé declared himself a Savoyard nobleman. When and how, as a Polish Crown officer, he obtained documents as a Prussian captain under the new surname remains unknown. It is also unclear why an exception was made for him from the 1764 imperial decree requiring foreign officers entering Russian service to be reduced by one rank.

On May 18, 1792, the Russo-Polish War began, during which his regiment fought as part of the 64,000-strong Moldavian Army under General-in-Chief Mikhail Vasilyevich Kakhovsky from Podolia and Volhynia to Warsaw. No records survive of Captain Ode-de-Sion's participation in this campaign. After the fighting ended, in January 1793 General-in-Chief Count Joseph Andreyevich Igelström replaced Kakhovsky as commander of Russian troops in Lithuania and Poland. Captain Ode-de-Sion was appointed officer for special assignments at his headquarters, located in the Russian Embassy building on Miodowa Street.

=== Warsaw and Kościuszko Uprisings (1794) ===
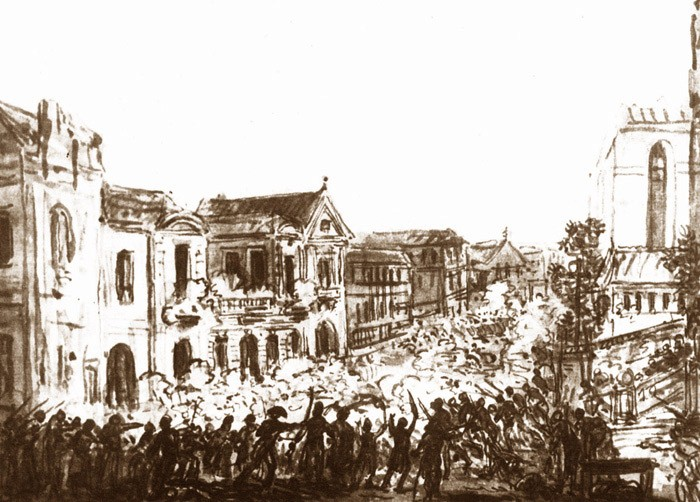
Storming of the Russian Embassy in Warsaw on April 7 (18), 1794.Jean-Pierre Norblin de La Gourdaine, 1794

Early on April 6, 1794, Poles massacred the Russian garrison in what became known as the Warsaw Uprising. Captain Ode-de-Sion was with the commander-in-chief, who barricaded himself in his residence on Miodowa Street. While Igelström hesitated indecisively, unsuccessfully trying to negotiate with King of Poland and rebel leaders, a small detachment (about two battalions) (Note: Before the Warsaw massacre Igelström had quartered 8,000 Russian troops in the city, but they were caught off guard, divided by insurgents, and unable to aid the commander.) under his staff officers repelled continuous enemy attacks. On April 8, with only slightly more than 400 armed men left in the embassy building, the officers decided to break out, forcing the commander to agree. Clearing their path with two regimental guns and covering the rearguard with two more, the Russian detachment advanced under heavy artillery and rifle fire, especially from nearby houses. Of Igelström's detachment that broke through to Warsaw suburbs under cover of Prussian allies, only 250 survived. (Note: During the Warsaw massacre 2,200 Russian servicemen and family members were killed.) Among them were Charles Osipovich, who showed "exceptional bravery and zeal for service", and his future patron Major General Count Nikolai Alexandrovich Zubov. In the city gripped by uprising and looting, Ode-de-Sion's wife Karolina Ivanovna remained, in the final stage of pregnancy.

Escaping Warsaw, Count Zubov immediately went to Saint Petersburg to report the uprising's start to Catherine II, while Captain Ode-de-Sion stayed in the camp of King of Prussia, where he met Prince Charles Henry of Nassau-Siegen. A retired admiral of the Russian galley fleet, famous for fearless adventures and exploits, the prince —highly valued by Frederick William II— was in his suite as a secret agent of the Russian empress. His mission coordinated allied actions and supplied Saint Petersburg firsthand campaign information, secretly reporting possible Prussian plan changes. Nassau-Siegen took a liking to the Russian-serving francophone officer familiar with Polish and Prussian military orders and willingly performing delicate tasks for the prince's mission. In July 1794, Lieutenant General Ivan Yevstafyevich Ferzen arrived with his corps to replace Igelström. The combined Russo-Prussian force began the siege of Warsaw, lifted after a month and a half of fruitless efforts — Frederick William II withdrew to suppress the Polish uprising in his rear. On September 1, 1794, Prussia exited the war, and Prince Nassau-Siegen departed for Berlin with the king. Ode-de-Sion, having gained Ferzen's favor, moved with his corps to join General-in-Chief Count Alexander Vasilyevich Suvorov. On November 4, combined Russian corps swiftly stormed Praga, Warsaw's fortified suburb, ending the uprising. Finding his family, Captain Ode-de-Sion learned his wife and newborn son Charles Constantin had survived the revolt safely, though their estate was looted and destroyed by insurgents. On July 28, 1795, for distinction in the Kościuszko Uprising battles, Charles Osipovich was promoted to major, granting him Russian hereditary nobility per the Table of Ranks and founding the Ode-de-Sion family.

=== Relationship with Suvorov (1796–1798) ===
In February 1795, Suvorov gave his daughter Natalya Suvorova in marriage to Count Nikolai Alexandrovich Zubov, and the following year entrusted him with finding a tutor for his eleven-year-old son Arkady. On the recommendation of the imperial favourite Prince Platon Zubov, Count Zubov proposed his former comrade-in-arms from the Warsaw campaign, Major Charles Osipovich Ode-de-Sion, for the role. Suvorov approved by letter, and Ode-de-Sion entered the household as Arkady's tutor.

==== Landowner Ode-de-Sion ====
Following the death of Catherine II on December 3, 1796, Major Ode-de-Sion retired from service. Under Paul I, who sought to eliminate perceived abuses of the previous reign, the use of military personnel for private purposes was prohibited. As a result, Ode-de-Sion and several other officers who had been drawing treasury pay while serving in private capacities were compelled to leave service.

In early 1797, Alexander Suvorov, having fallen into imperial disgrace, withdrew to his Kobryn Key estate. Nineteen retired officers, including Ode-de-Sion, accepted his invitation to join him there. In compensation for their abandoned careers, Suvorov promised each man several dozen serfs with accompanying land and agricultural holdings in perpetual ownership.

By late March 1797, Suvorov—stripped of his ranks and uniform—arrived at Kobryn and issued each officer a private letter granting ownership of serfs and land. These letters were registered in the Kobryn court protocol book in Polish, though without Suvorov's formal signature they lacked full legal force.

Reports soon reached Paul I alleging that Suvorov was fomenting unrest at Kobryn. (Note: The decisive report was, according to memoirist Countess Varvara Nikolayevna Golovina, a denunciation delivered on coronation day, April 5, by Lieutenant General Mikhail Petrovich Rumyantsev, motivated by a personal grudge against his former commander.) On April 22, 1797, imperial official Yury Alekseyevich Nikolev arrived at Kobryn with orders requiring Suvorov's immediate removal to his Novgorod estate at Konchanskoye. In the hasty departure that followed, the officers retrieved the protocol book and obtained Suvorov's signature on alienation papers covering nearly 1,200 serfs before he departed. Through this transaction, Ode-de-Sion became a Russian landowner, though the granted village was of poor quality—he subsequently wrote to Suvorov on three occasions requesting a replacement. (Note: Other officers in similar circumstances made comparable complaints.) By 1838, the Ode-de-Sion family estate comprised 75 serfs across the Velikoluksky, Kholmsky, and Toropetsky districts of Pskov Governorate.

=== Temporary management of Kobryn Key ===
Following Suvorov's departure, Ode-de-Sion returned to Saint Petersburg to resume his duties as tutor to Suvorov's son, Arkady, thereby avoiding the difficulties that befell his former companions. On May 20, 1797, Nikolev returned to Kobryn Key, arrested the remaining officers, and conveyed them to the Kiev Fortress; they were released after a two-month inquiry found no grounds for charges.

Suvorov's financial affairs had deteriorated significantly during this period. Civil and military claims against him, dormant under Catherine II, were revived under Paul I, eventually totalling several hundred thousand rubles. His annual estate income barely exceeded 40,000 rubles, while he suspected mismanagement and embezzlement by his chief estate manager, Lieutenant Colonel Koritsky, at Kobryn Key—formerly one of his most productive holdings. Unable to investigate while under surveillance at Konchanskoye, Suvorov sought a reliable intermediary to halt the estate's decline.

On the recommendation of his son-in-law Count Zubov, Suvorov appointed Ode-de-Sion temporary manager of Kobryn Key. On July 20, 1797, Suvorov granted him power of attorney with instructions to maximise estate revenues for debt repayment, replace Koritsky, restore order, and recover the villages gifted to the retired officers. Ode-de-Sion also carried a private commission from Count Zubov to direct a portion of estate income toward debts Suvorov owed the Zubov family.

The official pretext for Ode-de-Sion's presence at Kobryn—sanctioned by the emperor—was the retrieval of Suvorov's award diamonds, including the field marshal's baton and ceremonial swords, which remained in Koritsky's custody. These items, valued at over 300,000 rubles, constituted Suvorov's principal liquid asset. On September 21, 1797, they were conveyed to Konchanskoye by the estate's legal representative, Timofey Krasovsky.

Ode-de-Sion's tenure proved largely unsuccessful. Of the 23,000 rubles urgently required for court claims, only 3,000 were delivered—the remainder apparently redirected by Count Zubov. The retired officers refused to relinquish their granted villages voluntarily, and Ode-de-Sion's proposed repurchase scheme of 30,000 rubles came to nothing; most officers retained their holdings after Suvorov's death. His management also drew accusations from Koritsky and the other retired officers, including allegations of hosting lavish entertainments for local szlachta at Suvorov's expense and suspected plans to flee abroad with estate funds.

In January 1798, Suvorov summoned Ode-de-Sion to Konchanskoye, where he spent several weeks rendering account of the estate's affairs. Suvorov subsequently returned him to Saint Petersburg as Arkady's tutor and appointed Krasovsky chief manager of Kobryn Key—a position Krasovsky held until Suvorov's death.

==== Break with Count Suvorov ====
Charles Osipovich's Kobryn Key stay seriously undermined Suvorov's financial trust; due straitened circumstances he cut Arkady's already modest allowance from 2500 to 2000 rubles yearly. Yet after Petersburg return Ode-de-Sion constantly exceeded budget, prompting Suvorov complaints to relative and friend Count Dmitry Ivanovich Khvostov, calling son's tutor haydamak. Winter 1797–1798 Zubov family —where Arkady lived— fell into disgrace and left capital for Moscow. As pupil needed stay Saint Petersburg for court service, Charles Osipovich rented apartment settling there with whole family. Suvorov extremely dissatisfied—counted on free lodging with relative Count Khvostov. Late 1798 another tutor bill arrived in Konchanskoye seeming "robber's"; count decided final break with Ode-de-Sion:

Draftsman Sion again stole half-year maintenance; Arkady reportedly has nothing to wear. Count A. V. Suvorov. Letter to daughter Countess N. A. Zubova, December 27, 1798.

Count Zubov tried defending Ode-de-Sion, but Suvorov already knew joint appropriation of incomes and broke correspondence with son-in-law.

=== Later years ===
On August 25, 1799, Ode-de-Sion joined the First Cadet Corps as a teacher. Following Paul I's assassination, the Zubov family recovered their court influence, and on March 29, 1801, a imperial order restored Major Ode-de-Sion to active service in the presence of the new emperor Alexander I, assigning him to the same institution. He was subsequently transferred to the Old Ingermanland Musketeer Regiment in August 1802, and appointed class inspector of the Page Corps that October. He was promoted to lieutenant colonel on May 10, 1806, and to colonel on April 2, 1811.

In the autumn of 1812, his son Charles —a Leib-Guard ensign who had recently returned wounded from the Battle of Borodino—was arrested on suspicion of espionage, a charge that carried the death penalty under wartime law. Using his connections among the Saint Petersburg nobility, the elder Ode-de-Sion brought the matter to the attention of the emperor, who demanded an explanation from Field Marshal Golenishchev-Kutuzov. Kutuzov confirmed that suspicions had prompted the arrest but that no evidence had been found, leaving the final decision to the sovereign. The younger Ode-de-Sion was released in January 1813 into his father's custody in Saint Petersburg while the case was reviewed by the Committee of Ministers. In August of that year, the emperor ordered him to return to active duty as adjutant to General Mikhail Barclay de Tolly, and all charges were formally dropped by a Senate decision and the manifesto of August 30, 1814.

By the end of 1818, Colonel Ode-de-Sion again intervened on his son's behalf, petitioning the emperor and the Minister of Public Education to appoint Charles Charlesovich as governor of the Page Corps under his own supervision, rather than see him dispatched to the Caucasus as part of the planned disbandment of the Russian occupation corps in France. The petition was unsuccessful, though the younger Ode-de-Sion ultimately avoided the Caucasus by obtaining a posting in Congress Poland as adjutant to General Fyodor Filippovich Dovre.

Around 1824, Ode-de-Sion's wife Karolina Ivanovna lent more than 52,000 rubles to Anna Alekseyevna Zubova (1780–1849), widow of Major General Nikolai Vasilyevich Zubov, securing the loan against a share of the profitable Sysert metallurgical works in the Urals. The transaction became entangled in a prolonged legal dispute when Zubova's sister, Natalya Alekseyevna Koltovskaya (1773–1834)—a former favourite of Paul I who also held a share in the plant—persuaded Karolina Ivanovna to transfer the debt obligations to her while subsequently refusing repayment. The ensuing litigation in the Saint Petersburg Court of Conscience lasted several years and was ultimately decided against the Ode-de-Sion family, significantly worsening their financial position.

In 1826, the family's estate suffered a crop failure severe enough that Ode-de-Sion was forced to provision his serfs rather than receive any income from the estate. On September 18, 1827, he was discharged from service with the rank of major general, his uniform, and a full pension.

Following the end of the Napoleonic Wars, Ode-de-Sion undertook a search, at the request of his relatives in Savoy, for his nephew Joseph-Marie-Bernard Audé, a twenty-year-old voltigeur officer of the Young Guard who had gone missing during the 1812 Russian campaign. After years of inquiry, he established that his nephew had been wounded, taken prisoner, and died at Oryol in January 1813. On July 16, 1828, the retired major general formally notified his Savoyard relatives of the outcome.

=== Last years, death ===
Retired Major General Ode-de-Sion died January 5, 1837 buried family vault —decorated coats arms weapons— Volkovo Cemetery in Saint Petersburg. In 1930s the vault was destroyed. Family tradition marble slabs used furnishing Bolshoy Dom —new NKVD building in Leningrad. Ode-de-Sion graves location now unknown.

Little before death, Charles Osipovich corresponded brother Joseph Audé (1773–1838) —Annecy military pensioner— allocating part last inheritance own son Charles. But Savoy kin opposed ensured uncle estate entirely another nephew Baron Benoit-Jacques Audé. Charles Charlesovich Ode-de-Sion inherited father's large debts (Note: Dr. Francou mentions 16,000 francs in Audé family letters without further detail.) and family estate 75 serfs Pskov Governorate.

== Pedagogical activity (1789–1827) ==
The first mentions of Charles Audé's pedagogical activity are dated to his service in the Crown Army. According to a report by the school inspector of Poznań for 1789, he taught French to Polish students.

=== Arkady Suvorov's tutor (1796–1798) ===
In March 1796, Charles Osipovich, on the recommendation of his patron and comrade-in-arms Count Zubov, became Arkady Suvorov's, the eleven-year-old son of the great commander's tutor. Count Zubov regularly reported to Suvorov on the progress of his education: "Sion is quite attentive and, without blunting his innate lively character, instills good principles in him..."

In November 1796, Suvorov noted in a letter to his son-in-law that he was "very pleased" with his son's studies. At the beginning of 1797, lessons with Arkady were interrupted for several months due to Charles Osipovich's first trip to the Kobrin Key. They resumed upon Ode-de-Sion's return to Saint Petersburg at the end of April. On 14 July of the same year, he arrived with his pupil to the exiled Suvorov in Konchanskoye. Already on 20 July, they had to part again for almost half a year due to Charles Osipovich's departure to the Kobrin key as temporary manager. When this assignment was reported to Paul I on 28 August of the same year, the emperor added the resolution: "Sion can stay with Count Suvorov as the tutor of his son, but no one else is allowed to visit him".

After returning to Saint Petersburg in early February 1798, Charles Osipovich came back to his lessons with Arkady. In August of the same year, the pupil turned 14, and Ode-de-Sion wrote to Suvorov about his intention to begin visits with the young man to give him a visual idea of social customs and morals, as well as to establish useful acquaintances. However, the count categorically disapproved, as he was an opponent of worldly education and academic scholasticism:

Charles Osipovich Sion's letter demonstrates commendable propriety, but it does not conform to Russian customs — especially mine — but rather to German ones for a young count and the rules of the Academy. Arkady needs sound morals, not socialising with frivolous youths where they are likely to go astray...

At first, the boy lived in Saint Petersburg with Count Zubov, under the supervision of his wife, Natalia, his elder sister. The tutor only visited him for lessons. However, in November 1797, the Zubovs were forced to leave the capital. Arkady was settled with his entire family in a small apartment rented at Suvorov's expense by Ode-de-Sion. The latter was greatly dissatisfied with this arrangement. As he had other complaints about his son's tutor as well, Charles Osipovich parted ways with his pupil permanently at the end of 1798.

=== Teacher at the Land Cadet Corps (1798–1802) ===
In February 1798, while still tutoring Arkady Suvorov, retired Major Ode-de-Sion was hired as a private tutor by his former commander in Poland, General of Infantry Count Ivan Yevstafyevich Ferzen, director of the Land Cadet Corps. Charles Osipovich's duties included preparing for cadet life those noble children whom Ferzen placed in the corps through his patronage. One such pupil of Ode-de-Sion for several months was the future Russian writer and journalist of Polish origin Faddei Bulgarin, who was enrolled in the corps on 13 November 1798. At the end of the same year, General-Lieutenant Matvey Lamzdorf replaced Count Ferzen as director. Under him, on 25 August 1799, Ode-de-Sion was enrolled in the corps staff as a teacher and taught fortification. In 1800, the "Land Noble Cadet Corps" was renamed the "First Cadet Corps". On 23 November of the same year, Lamzdorf was replaced by His Serene Highness Prince Platon Alexandrovich Zubov, who three months later became chief of this military educational institution, and Major-General Friedrich Maximilian Klinger (known in the West as the Saxon writer Friedrich Maximilian von Klinger), who had previously served there as inspector of classes, was appointed director in his place. (Note: Major General Klinger, better known in the West as the Saxon writer Friedrich Maximilian von Klinger, entered Russian service during the reign of Catherine II.) In March 1801, when Major Ode-de-Sion was recalled from retirement, his place of service was designated as the same First Cadet Corps.

=== Class inspector at the Page Corps (1802–1827) ===
In February 1798, while still tutoring Arkady Suvorov, Ode-de-Sion was engaged as a private tutor by General of Infantry Count Ivan Ferzen, then Director of the Land Cadet Corps, to prepare noble children for cadet life under his patronage. Among his pupils during this period was the future writer Faddei Bulgarin, enrolled in the corps on November 13, 1798. On August 25, 1799, Ode-de-Sion was formally enrolled in the corps staff as a teacher of fortification. In 1800, the institution was renamed the First Cadet Corps, and in 1801 Prince Platon Zubov became its chief, with Major-General Friedrich Maximilian von Klinger appointed director.

Under Alexander I, Klinger also assumed oversight of the Page Corps, transforming it on October 10, 1802 from a court institution into a military educational establishment. Klinger sought to staff it with officers who combined pedagogical ability with combat experience, and appointed Ode-de-Sion—whose abilities he trusted from their time together at the First Cadet Corps—as class inspector on October 28, 1802. In this role, Ode-de-Sion oversaw the academic department and corps library, supervised teaching staff, drew up the curriculum, and monitored students' progress. His surviving administrative records in the corps archives include monthly reports in French on pupils' diligence, examination score lists, and mandatory teacher award recommendations.

The Page Corps curriculum was among the most comprehensive of any Russian military educational institution of the period, encompassing humanities (history, geography, jurisprudence, diplomacy), three mandatory languages (Russian, French, and German), mathematics, physics, drawing, and military disciplines including fortification, artillery, and tactics. Ode-de-Sion tended to maintain collegial relations with teaching staff and resolved conflicts without dismissals. The faculty was consequently diverse in quality: it included distinguished figures such as academician Charles Hermann, who taught political sciences until 1812 and was remembered by many graduates for his lectures, alongside less capable individuals.

Ode-de-Sion's own son Charles was enrolled in the Page Corps in 1802, graduating in 1811. Notable pupils during Ode-de-Sion's tenure included the future Decembrist Pavel Pestel (in the same class as Charles from 1810), the sons of his patron Count Nikolai Zubov—Alexander (top graduate of 1814), Platon (top graduate of 1816), and Valerian (graduate of 1823), who by imperial exception resided in the inspector's apartment rather than the barracks—and Magnus Barclay de Tolly (graduate of 1815), only son of General Mikhail Barclay de Tolly, who was personally entrusted to Ode-de-Sion's care by his father.

Around 1814, a secret society formed among a group of pages who held clandestine meetings and engaged in freethinking discussion. In 1820, members of this group played a central role in a serious incident of collective insubordination known as the "Arsenyev mutiny". When a page named Pavel Arsenyev refused to comply with a punishment ordered by Ode-de-Sion and resisted corporal punishment before the assembled formation, a faction of pages broke ranks to intervene. Several officers and teachers were injured in the resulting confrontation, and Ode-de-Sion was knocked to the floor. The emperor subsequently ordered Arsenyev exempted from further flogging and the ringleader Alexander Krenitsyn to receive thirty strokes; both were demoted and transferred to a line regiment. Arsenyev later took his own life.

During the investigation of the Decembrist revolt of 1825, approximately forty former pupils of the Page Corps were identified as members of or connected to the Decembrist secret societies. Several graduates from Ode-de-Sion's tenure were convicted by the Supreme Criminal Court, including Pestel (first category) and Pyotr Svistunov (second category), who had led a St. Petersburg cell of the Southern Society.

Contemporary assessments of the quality of education at the Page Corps during Ode-de-Sion's tenure were divided. Some former pupils, including Lieutenant-General Pyotr Daragan, characterised the teaching as unsystematic and superficial, attributing this in part to the inspector's formality and limited command of Russian. Others, including Count Vladimir Adlerberg and Major-General Aleksandr Mirkovich, disputed this characterisation and regarded the Page Corps as the finest educational institution of its time in Russia. Later historians have attributed the uneven quality of instruction primarily to the pronounced social gap between the raznochintsy teaching staff and their aristocratic pupils, who, as one account noted, studied "not to know something, but only to graduate as officers". Ode-de-Sion served as class inspector for twenty-five years, retiring with the rank of major-general on September 18, 1827.

== Masonic activity (1784–1822) ==
In 1784, Crown officer Charles Audé received initiation into the first degree of the Masonic lodge "School of Wisdom" in Poznań. This lodge was founded in the same year by Alexander Potworowski, who became its first Worshipful Master. In 1786, during his last visit to Savoy, Charles Audé joined the lodge "Triple Square", established in Annecy on 6 June of that year. It is in the documents of this lodge that his Masonic nickname first appears: "Knight of the Fortress of Sion". He chose the Masonic motto: "Sion is my camp". Upon returning to Poznań in 1787, he attended meetings of the "School of Wisdom" until 1790 and achieved the second degree of initiation there. In the Savoy lodge, he was listed as an "absent member" at least until 1791 — the year he entered Russian service. No information exists about Charles Ode-de-Sion's connections to Freemasonry during the subsequent 11 years. Indeed, in Russia at the end of the 18th century, the rapid flourishing of lodges coincided with the beginning of the Great French Revolution, which aroused the fears of Catherine II. On the empress's direct orders, Russian authorities actively persecuted Freemasons: some were imprisoned, others exiled or placed under surveillance, and lodge activities were banned. Under Paul I, the repressions ceased, and many brethren were pardoned. However, the emperor left the ban on open Masonic activity in force.

=== In the lodge "United Friends" ===
Emblem of the Masonic lodge "United Friends" (1815)

In the early years of Alexander I's reign, Freemasonry entered what contemporaries regarded as a golden age in Russia, as the emperor tacitly permitted the opening of new lodges. On June 10, 1802, Ode-de-Sion joined Privy Councillor Alexander Alekseyevich Zherbtsov (1754–1807) and Count Alexander Osterman-Tolstoy in founding the lodge "United Friends" at Zherbtsov's residence on the English Embankment in Saint Petersburg, with imperial permission. The following year, Zherbtsov's son Alexander Alexandrovich returned from a diplomatic mission to Europe, bringing acts of the French Rite and a high degree of initiation; he became the lodge's long-serving Worshipful Master.

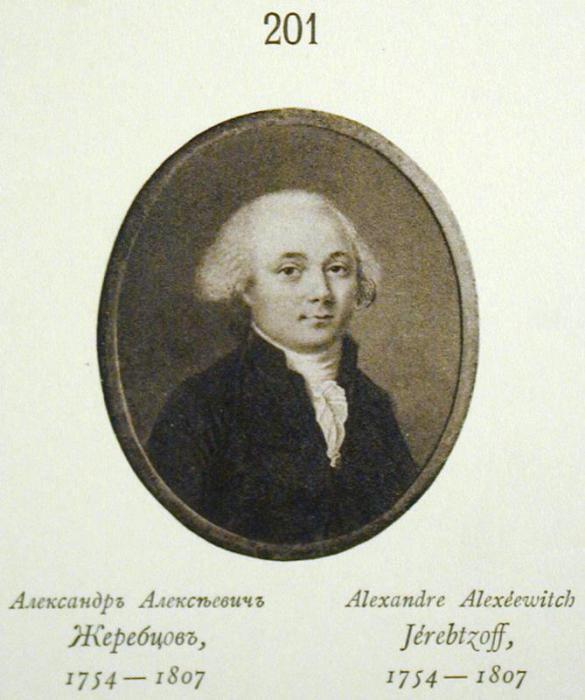
Alexander Alekseyevich Zherbtsov, founder of the lodge "United Friends"

The lodge's membership grew rapidly and attained considerable social prominence, eventually including Grand Duke Konstantin Pavlovich, future Chief of Gendarmes Alexander von Benckendorff, Minister of Police Alexander Balashov, and others. By 1810, it counted 50 full members and 29 honorary ones. The lodge was widely regarded as aristocratic and freethinking; its meetings frequently gave way to elaborate banquets accompanied by an orchestra, and on occasion by women—unusual for an institution then considered a strictly male domain. This reputation added to its popularity while earning disapproval from Masons of stricter obediences.

After the Zherbtsov house was sold in 1806 and the lodge spent several years in various temporary premises, Ode-de-Sion obtained permission to establish a Masonic temple in the crypt of the chapel of the Vorontsov Palace, to which the Page Corps relocated in 1810. That same year, the government moved to regulate Masonic activity, compelling the "United Friends" to abandon its independence, adopt the stricter Swedish Rite, and join the union of the "Grand Directorial Lodge 'Vladimir to Order'". Within this structure, Ode-de-Sion served from 1810 as censor of speeches, as well as holding the positions of preparant and almoner in the degree of Rose Croix.

During the Patriotic War of 1812, Ode-de-Sion assumed de facto leadership of the lodge while Zherbtsov served on campaign, signing Masonic diplomas as Vénérable... par interim (acting Worshipful Master). Upon Zherbtsov's return in 1814 he formally resumed his position, though he continued to manage the lodge largely by correspondence from Mitau.

In 1816, a schism developed in Russian Freemasonry following the government's authorisation of the more liberal Grand Lodge "Astrea" under Count Vasily Musin-Pushkin, prompting a significant outflow from Zherbtsov's directorial lodge. On August 2, 1816, Ode-de-Sion was entrusted with negotiating a union between the two grand lodges; he reported that Musin-Pushkin had responded favourably, and successfully argued against delay before the assembled lodge. Nevertheless, conservative opposition prevented the union from being concluded. Following further instability, including the exposure of corrupt conduct by a senior lodge member, Zherbtsov departed. On December 11, 1816, the "United Friends" withdrew from the "Grand Provincial Lodge", and Ode-de-Sion was elected Worshipful Master. From March 1817 the lodge joined the union of "Astrea", conducting its works in French and Russian. Ode-de-Sion was reelected Worshipful Master in 1818 and retained the position until 1821, when the lodge ceased activity.

==== Mentor of Pestel in Freemasonry ====
Ode-de-Sion's membership in the lodge was not concealed from his pupils at the Page Corps. At the end of 1811, the top student of the graduating chamber-page class, Pavel Pestel, approached him with a request for admission to the lodge. Notwithstanding the government prohibition on initiating persons under 25 years of age, Ode-de-Sion sponsored Pestel's initiation to the first, apprentice degree before he had even graduated. On March 1, 1812, already commissioned as an ensign in the Leib Guard Lithuanian Regiment, Pestel received the diploma of Master of the lodge "United Friends", signed by Ode-de-Sion among the lodge officers as almoner. The organisational methods Pestel absorbed through Freemasonry informed his later activities in the Decembrist secret societies.

=== Participation in Masonic organizations ===
During his long Masonic career, Charles Osipovich Ode-de-Sion was a member of a large number of lodges and other fraternal unions. The following list is compiled based on the encyclopedic dictionary by Andrey Ivanovich Serkov Russian Freemasonry. 1731–2000:

Masonic organizations to which Charles Osipovich Ode-de-Sion belonged
Period	Country	City	Organization
1784–1790	Polish–Lithuanian Commonwealth	Poznań	Lodge "School of Wisdom"
1786–1791	Kingdom of Sardinia	Annecy	Lodge "Triple Square"
1802–1822	Russian Empire	Saint Petersburg	Directorial Lodge "Astrea" (Note: Representative of the lodge "United Friends", Mason of the eighth degree. Grand Honorary Official. Second Grand Warden until 1822. Representative of the Swedish system in the Chapter of Rites and its Grand Deputy Master in 1818.)
1802–1822	Russian Empire	Saint Petersburg	Lodge "White Eagle"
1802–1822	Russian Empire	Saint Petersburg	Grand Provincial Lodge (Note: Created in place of the closed "Directorial Lodge 'Vladimir to Order'" and its full successor, as announced by Grand Master Zherbtsov at the extraordinary meeting on 19 September 1816.)
1802–1822	Russian Empire	Saint Petersburg	Lodge "Elizaveta to Virtue"
1802–1822	Russian Empire	Saint Petersburg	Lodge "Chosen Michael"
1802–1822	Russian Empire	Saint Petersburg	Lodge "Russian Eagle"
1802–1822	Russian Empire	Saint Petersburg	Lodge "Pelican"
1802–1822	Russian Empire	Saint Petersburg	Lodge "Peter to Truth"
1802–1822	Russian Empire	Saint Petersburg	Lodge "Blazing Star"
1802–1822	Russian Empire	Saint Petersburg	Lodge "Northern Friends"
1802–1822	Russian Empire	Saint Petersburg	Lodge "United Friends" (Note: Founding member. In 1810, preparant and almoner (charitable brother) in the degree of Rose Croix, from the same year censor of speeches. First Deputy Master from 13 May 1816, Worshipful Master 1816–1821.)
1802–1822	Russian Empire	Saint Petersburg	Lodge "Sphinx"
1802–1822	Russian Empire	Saint Petersburg	Chapter "Phoenix" (Note: In 1811, Grand Brother of Humanity. Member of the Chapter of the ninth degree, Grand Chancellor and its Honorary Commander. Expelled 19 March 1817. From 1818, sub-prefect of the Chapter.)
1802–1822	Russian Empire	Saint Petersburg	Scottish Directory
1802–1822	Russian Empire	Simbirsk	Lodge "Key to Virtue"

Charles Osipovich Ode-de-Sion remained an active figure in the brotherhood of Freemasons until its complete prohibition by the highest rescript of Alexander I dated 1 August 1822, which ordered: "All secret societies, under whatever names they may exist—be they Masonic lodges or others—are to be closed, and their establishment henceforth not permitted".

== Family and descendants ==
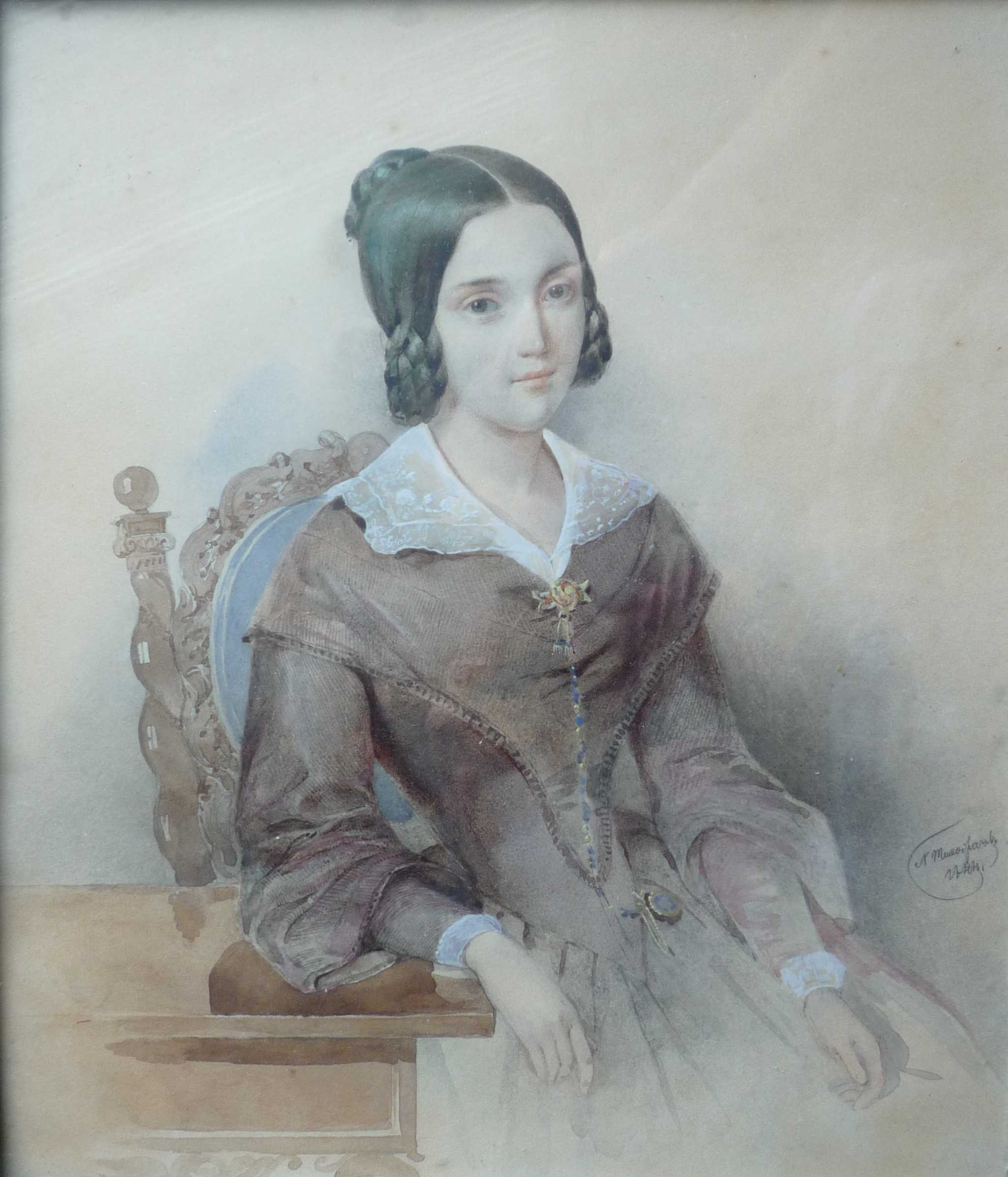
A portrait of Anna Vasilyevna: wife of grandson Alexander Charlesovich Ode-de-Sion

In 1790, still being a Polish Crown officer, Charles married Caroline-Sophie von Ziebert (also spelled Sielbert; 1771–1830), who was born in Breslau. As part of her dowry, she brought an estate in Warsaw, where the young family lived initially. Upon joining her husband in becoming a subject of the Russian Empire, she took the name Karolina Ivanovna. In 1792, the Ode-de-Sion couple had a daughter, who was baptized in the Basilica of the Holy Cross and named Augusta Carolina Wilhelmina. Her further fate is unknown; she likely died in childhood. While being pregnant with their second child, Karolina Ivanovna was separated from her husband by the events of the Warsaw Uprising (also known as the Warsaw Matins). Having safely survived the looting of their Warsaw estate by marauders, she gave birth a few days later, on 26 April 1794, to their only son Charles, who would later become a participant in the Patriotic War of 1812, a State Councillor, and Vice-Governor of Saratov Governorate. It was only after Russian troops occupied Warsaw in November of that year that Captain Ode-de-Sion was able to locate his family and see his newborn son for the first time.

Around 1824, Karolina Ivanovna lent a large sum —more than 52,000 rubles— to the widow of Major-General Anna Alexandrovna Zubova, secured by reliable collateral. However, due to fraud committed by the latter's elder sister, Natalia Alekseevna Koltovskaya, the Ode-de-Sions were unable to recover the money. These significant debts were inherited by their son Charles Charlesovich, who spent a substantial portion of his income repaying them. As a result, their only grandson, State Councillor Alexander Charlesovich, had to support his large family solely on the salary he received as manager of the Oranienbaum Palace Administration. After Alexander Charlesovich's early death in 1857, his widow, the well-born but not wealthy noblewoman Anna Vasilyevna Ode-de-Sion, secured the position of director of the Orenburg Institute for Noble Maidens in Orenburg in order to provide for herself, her two sons, and three daughters. Thanks to her efforts, the Ode-de-Sion family line did not die out. Its descendants continue to live in the post-Soviet space, while some, having emigrated after the October Revolution, reside in France.

== Awards ==
- On 28 February 1795, he was awarded the highest Prussian military order For Merit (Pour le Mérite).
- On 8 November 1808, for diligent service, he was awarded the Order of Saint Vladimir 4th class.
- On 26 November 1826, for length of service, he was awarded the Order of Saint George 4th class.

== Language knowledge ==
Charles Osipovich Ode-de-Sion was proficient to varying degrees in at least four languages. French was his native tongue, and thanks to his theological education, he was able to express himself fluently in writing and speech in "refined Latin". In addition, his 1817 service record indicates that he could read and write in German and Russian. However, as late as 1802, upon his appointment to the Page Corps after eleven years of service in Russia, he "assumed his duties completely unfamiliar with the Russian language, and even wrote reports to his superiors in French".

== Verbal portrait ==
No images of Major-General Ode-de-Sion are known to exist in Russian sources. However, it is documented that he sent at least one portrait miniature of himself, painted in 1827 at the age of 69 by Jean-Henri Benner, to relatives in Savoy. In the second half of the 20th century, the French historian Dr. Francou had the opportunity to see it and provided the following verbal description of Charles Osipovich's appearance in his book:

His portrait <...> reveals a man of action whose features are like Winston Churchill's: a broad forehead with receding hairline, short nose, penetrating eyes, the faint outline of a benevolent smile; the gold of the epaulettes and the red of the collar stand out against the dark green of the tunic.

== Assessments ==
Following his participation in the Polish campaign of 1794, Ode-de-Sion received highly favourable recommendations from both of his superiors to the Military Collegium: Baron Igelström (3 December 1795) and Prince Nassau-Siegen (10 September 1794) praised his exemplary conduct, diligence and precision in performing his duties, 'as befits a good and conscientious officer".

However, Lieutenant-General Pyotr Mikhailovich Daragan spoke of Charles Osipovich rather disparagingly in his memoirs about his years of study in the Page Corps, believing that he preferred 'good wine, a good dinner, and his Masonic lodge' to concern for the pages' education. However, in his memoirs, Philipp Philippovich Vigel described Charles Osipovich as a kind, cheerful and intelligent man who inspired love and respect from the pages and Masons alike, and who 'lacked the insolence and turbulence of the nation to which he belonged'.

== Bibliography ==
- Engelhardt, Lev Nikolaevich (1868). Notes of Lev Nikolaevich Engelhardt (Записки Льва Николаевича Энгельгардта) (in Russian). Moscow: Russian Archive.
- Taras, Anatoly Efimovich (2008). Anatomy of Hatred: Russo-Polish Conflicts in the 18th–20th Centuries (Анатомия ненависти: русско-польские конфликты в XVIII—XX вв.). Unknown Wars. Minsk: Harvest. p. 832. ISBN 978-985-16-1774-2.
- Golovkin, Fyodor Gavrilovich (2014). The Court and Reign of Paul I: Portraits, Memoirs (Двор и царствование Павла I: Портреты, воспоминания). Moscow: Direct-Media. p. 388. ISBN 978-5-4475-0217-1.
- Orlov, Nikolai Aleksandrovich (1894). The Storming of Prague by Suvorov in 1794 (Штурм Праги Суворовым в 1794 году). St. Petersburg: Printing House of the Guards Staff and St. Petersburg Military District. p. 134.
- Petrushevsky, Alexander Fomich (1884). Generalissimo Prince Suvorov (Генералиссимусъ князь Суворовъ) (in Russian). Vol. 2. St. Petersburg: Printing House of M. M. Stasyulevich. p. 473.
- Chancellor Prince Alexander Andreevich Bezborodko in Connection with the Events of His Time (Канцлер князь Александр Андреевич Безбородко в связи с событиями его времени). Collection of the Imperial Russian Historical Society (in Russian). Vol. 29. St. Petersburg: Imperial Russian Historical Society. 1881. p. 736.
- Marchenko, Mitrofan Konstantinovich (1900). Alexander Vasilyevich Suvorov in His Manuscripts (Александр Васильевич Суворов в своих рукописях) (in Russian). St. Petersburg: Printing House of the Main Directorate of Appanages. p. 71.
- von Freyman, Otto Rudolfovich (1894). Pages over 183 Years (1711–1894): Biographies of Former Pages, with Portraits (Пажи за 183 года (1711—1894): Биографии бывших пажей, с портретами) (in Russian). Vol. 1. Part: Reign of Emperor Alexander I. Friedrichsham: Joint-Stock Company Printing House. p. 952.
- Golovina, Varvara Nikolaevna (1900). Memoirs of Countess Varvara Nikolaevna Golovina (1766–1819) (Записки графини Варвары Николаевны Головиной (1766—1819)) (in Russian). Translated from French manuscript, edited with notes by E. S. Shumigorsky. St. Petersburg: Printing House of A. S. Suvorin. p. 286.
- Kianskaya, Oksana Ivanovna (2002). Pavel Pestel: Officer, Scout, Conspirator (Павел Пестель: офицер, разведчик, заговорщик). Moscow: Paralleli. p. 512. ISBN 978-5-93273-063-8.
- Kianskaya, Oksana Ivanovna (2005). Pestel (Пестель). Life of Remarkable People. Moscow: Molodaya Gvardiya. p. 355. ISBN 9785235028296.
- Ivanova, V. P. (1966). Prisoners of Peter and Paul Fortress (Узники Петропавловской крепости). Part: P. I. Pestel. Leningrad: Lenizdat. p. 43. ISBN 978-0-598-69425-6.
- Davydov, Mikhail Abramovich (1994). Opposition of His Majesty (Оппозиция Его Величества). Part: Nobility and Reforms at the Beginning of the 19th Century: Textbook. Moscow: Russian State University for the Humanities. p. 189. ISBN 978-5-7281-0022-5.
- Derzhavin, Gavriil Romanovich (1860). Notes of Derzhavin. 1743–1812 (Записки Державина. 1743—1812) (in Russian). With literary and historical notes by P. I. Bartenev. Moscow: Publication of Russian Conversation. p. 407.
- Suvorov, Alexander Vasilyevich (1986). Letters: Collection of Letters of the Great Russian Commander A. V. Suvorov (Письма: Сборник писем великого русского полководца А. В. Суворова). Literary Monuments. Executive editor A. M. Samsonov. Moscow: Nauka.
- Bulgarin, Faddey Venediktovich (2013). Memoirs (Воспоминания). Litres. p. 1055. ISBN 9785457039308.
- Beskrovny, L. G. (1955). M. I. Kutuzov: Collection of Documents and Materials (М. И. Кутузов: Сборник документов и материалов). Vol. 2. Moscow: Military Publishing House. p. 848.
- Brachev, Viktor Stepanovich (2000). Masons in Russia: From Peter I to the Present Day (Масоны в России: от Петра I до наших дней). St. Petersburg: Stomma.
- Pyipin, Alexander Nikolaevich (1997). Freemasonry in Russia: 18th and First Quarter of the 19th Century (Масонство в России: XVIII и первая четверть XIX в.). Edited, notes: G. V. Vernadsky, S. S. Moskalenko (reprint of: Pypin A. Russian Freemasonry. Petrograd: Ogni, 1916). Moscow: Vek. p. 488. ISBN 5-88987-035-1.
- Smirnova-Rosset, Alexandra Osipovna (1989). Diary. Memoirs (Дневник. Воспоминания). Literary Monuments of the USSR Academy of Sciences. Executive editor V. E. Vatsuro, prepared by S. V. Zhitomirskaya. Moscow: Nauka. p. 790. ISBN 5-02-012669-1.
- Peskov, Aleksey Mikhaylovich (1990). Baratynsky: A True Tale (Боратынский: Истинная повесть). Moscow: Kniga. p. 384. ISBN 5-212-00115-3.
- Karsavin, Lev Platonovich (2014). Monasticism in the Middle Ages (Монашество в средние века). Moscow: Lomonosov. p. 192. ISBN 978-5-91678-189-2.
- Solovyov, Sergey Mikhaylovich (1863). History of the Fall of Poland (История падения Польши) (PDF) (in Russian). Moscow: Grachev and Co. Printing House. p. 378.
- Vigel, Filipp Filippovich (1928). Notes (Записки). Vol. 2. Edited with introductory article by S. Ya. Shtraikh. Moscow: Krug. p. 358.
- Gak, Vladimir Grigoryevich; Ganshina, K. A. (2010). New French-Russian Dictionary: 70,000 Words, 200,000 Translation Units (Новый французско-русский словарь: 70000 слов, 200000 единиц перевода) (14 ed.). Moscow: Drofa. p. 1160. ISBN 9785358080034.
- All-Highest Orders Given in the Presence of H.I.M. the Sovereign Emperor (Всевысочайшие приказы, отданные в присутствии е.и.в. государя императора) (in Russian). St. Petersburg: Printing House of the State Military Collegium. 1801.
- Gangeblov, Alexander Semyonovich (1888). Memoirs of Decembrist Alexander Semyonovich Gangeblov (Воспоминания декабриста Александра Семеновича Гангеблова) (in Russian). Moscow: University Printing House. p. 282.
- Medvedeva, I. (1936). Early Baratynsky (Ранний Баратынский). Vol. 1. In: Baratynsky E. A. Complete Collection of Poems. Leningrad: Sovetsky Pisatel. pp. XXXV–LXXVII.
- Serkov, Andrey Ivanovich (2001). Russian Freemasonry: 1731–2000: Encyclopedic Dictionary (Русское масонство: 1731—2000: Энциклопедический словарь). Moscow: ROSSPEN. p. 1224. ISBN 5-8243-0240-5.
- Eidelman, Natan Yakovlevich (1986). Turn of the Centuries: Political Struggle in Russia. End of 18th – Beginning of 19th Century (Грань веков: Политическая борьба в России. Конец XVIII — начало XIX столетия). Moscow: Mysl. p. 368.
- Zubov, Valentin Platonovich (2007). Paul I (Павел I). St. Petersburg: Aleteyya. p. 264. ISBN 978-5-903354-57-3.
- Margolis, Alexander Davidovich (2015). St. Petersburg: History and Modernity: Selected Essays (Петербург: История и современность: Избранные очерки). Litres. ISBN 9785457654778.
- Great Encyclopedia: Masons (Большая энциклопедия: Масоны). Vol. 2. Moscow: Geleos. 2007. p. 336. ISBN 978-5-8189-0951-6.
- Kartashev, B. I.; Muravyov, Vladimir Bronislavovich (1958). Pestel (Пестель). Molodaya Gvardiya. p. 336.
- Sokolovskaya, Tira Ottovna; Lotareva, D. D. (2007). Secret Archives of Russian Masons (Тайные архивы русских масонов). Secret Societies, Orders and Sects. Moscow: Veche. p. 476. ISBN 978-5-9533-1856-3.
- Bashilov, Boris (1994). History of Russian Freemasonry: Issues 9, 10, and 11 (История русского масонства: Выпуск 9-й, 10-й и 11-й). Issue 9: Alexander I and His Time. Moscow: MPKP "Ruslo". p. 112. ISBN 5-87900-002-8.
- Semevsky, Vasily Ivanovich (1995). Political and Social Ideas of the Decembrists (Политические и общественные идеи декабристов). Chapter III: Mason-Decembrists. Moscow: Kniga po Trebovaniyu. p. 698. ISBN 9785458093828.
- Karpachev, S. P. (2007). Secrets of Masonic Orders (Тайны масонских орденов). Moscow: Yauza-Press. p. 352. ISBN 978-5-903339-28-0.
- Gurkovsky, V. A. (2005). Cadet Corps of the Russian Empire (Кадетские корпуса Российской империи). Vol. 1. Moscow: Bely Bereg. p. 262. ISBN 5-98353-005-4.
- Reference Book of Orenburg Governorate for 1870 (Справочная книжка Оренбургской губернии на 1870 год) (in Russian). Orenburg: Governorate Printing House. 1870.
- Catherine II (1830). "January 14, 1764: Highest-Confirmed Report of the Military Collegium — On Accepting into Service Former Holstein and Other Foreign Service Staff and Ober-Officers with Demotion by One Rank, and Ensigns and Cornets with the Same Ranks (12.014 — Генваря 14. 1764. Высочайше утвержденный доклад Военной коллегіи — О приниманіи въ службу...)". Complete Collection of Laws of the Russian Empire (in Russian). XVI. St. Petersburg: Printing House of the 2nd Section of His Imperial Majesty's Own Chancery: 495.
- Général Susane (2008). History of the Alsace Regiment (Régiment d'Alsace: Historique) (PDF) (in French). France: ANCESTRAMIL.
- "Ode-de-Sion, Karl Iosifovich". Russian Biographical Dictionary. Vol. 12. pp. 109–111.
- "Igelström, Osip Andreevich". Encyclopedic Dictionary of Brockhaus and Efron. Vol. XII. p. 777.
- Velichko, K. I. (1913). "Klinger, Fyodor Ivanovich". Military Encyclopedia. Vol. 12. pp. 593–594.
- Martyanov, P. K. (1884). "Suvorov in Exile (Суворов в ссылке)". Historical Herald. XVIII. St. Petersburg.
- Boldina, E. G. (2001). "On the Activities of the Highest-Established Commission to Investigate the Behavior and Actions of Some Moscow Residents During the Enemy Occupation of the Capital (О деятельности Высочайше учрежденной комиссии...)". Patriotic War of 1812: Sources, Monuments, Problems. 9. Moscow: KALITA: 302.
- "Orders to the 1st Western Army (Приказы по 1-й Западной армии)". Russian Archive: History of the Fatherland... VII. Moscow: Studio TRITE: Russian Archive: 656. 1996.
- Neklyudov, E. G. (2003). "Sysert Factories of the Heirs of A. F. Turchaninov at the End of the 18th – Mid-19th Century: Model of "Conflicting Ownership" (Сысертские заводы наследников А. Ф. Турчанинова...)". Ural Historical Herald (9). Yekaterinburg: Akademkniga: 103–120.
- Kudzevich, L. V. (2004). "Masonic Documents in the Collection of the State Museum of Political History of Russia: Clarification of Attribution and Exhibition Possibilities (Масонские документы в собрании государственного музея...)". Political History of Russia. Theory and Museum Practice (IV). St. Petersburg: State Museum of Political History of Russia: 62–65.
- Antonov, Viktor (2008). "Here the Conspiracy Was Forged... (Здесь ковался заговор...)". Saint Petersburg Vedomosti. No. 131. St. Petersburg.
- Rudakov, V. E. (1894). Игельстрём, Осип Андреевич // Энциклопедический словарь Брокгауза и Ефрона: в 86 т. (82 т. и 4 доп.) [Igelström, Osip Andreevich // Encyclopedic Dictionary of Brockhaus and Efron: in 86 volumes (82 volumes and 4 supplements)]. Vol. XII. СПб: Wikiteka. p. 777.
- Petrov, A. A. (1902). Оде-де-Сион, Карл Иосифович // Русский биографический словарь: в 25 томах [Ode de Sion, Karl Iosifovich // Russian Biographical Dictionary: in 25 volumes]. Vol. 12: Обезьянинов — Очкин. СПб.: Wikiteka. pp. 109–111.
- Daragan, P. M. (1875). "Memoirs of the First Chamber Page of Grand Duchess Alexandra Feodorovna. 1817–1819 (Воспоминания первого камер-пажа великой княгини Александры Феодоровны. 1817—1819)". Russian Antiquity. 12 (4). St. Petersburg: 769–796 (continued in vol. 13, issue 5, pp. 1–19).
- Gorshkov, D. I. (2011). Moscow and the Patriotic War of 1812 (Москва и Отечественная война 1812 г). Moscow: Main Archive Directorate of the City of Moscow. p. 640. ISBN 978-5-8243-0240-0.
- Nemchinova, L. E. (2013). Wisdom of Astrea: Masonic Monuments of the 18th – First Third of the 19th Century in the Hermitage Collection (Премудрость Астреи: Памятники масонства XVIII — первой трети XIX века в собрании Эрмитажа). St. Petersburg: State Hermitage Publishing House. p. 480. ISBN 978-5-93572-449-8.
- Karpachev, S. P. (2015). The Art of Free Masons (Искусство вольных каменщиков). IPK Pareto-Print. p. 475. ISBN 9785990549319.
- Frolov, N. V.; Frolova, E. V. (2000). "Monument of the Zubov Family in Mekhovitsy (Памятник семейства Зубовых в Меховицах)". Kovrov Historical Collection. Kovrov: Mashteks: 7–10. ISBN 5-93787-017-4.
- Volkonsky, Sergey Grigoryevich (1902). Notes of Prince Sergey Grigoryevich Volkonsky (Decembrist) (Записки Сергія Григорьевича Волконскаго (декабриста)) (in Russian). With afterword by publisher Prince M. S. Volkonsky. 2nd ed., corrected and supplemented. Russia: Synodal Printing House. p. 548.

=== In other languages ===
- Bailly-Maître, Marie-Christine; Ploquin, Alain; Garioud, Nadège (2001). Iron in the Alps from the Middle Ages to the 19th Century (Le fer dans les Alpes du moyen-âge au XIXe siècle) (Conference publication). Temps modernes (in French). Vol. 4. Part: History of Savoy. Montagnac, Hérault, France: M. Mergoil. p. 243. ISBN 9782907303484.
- Hildebrand, Karl Friedrich; Zweng, Christian (1998). Knights of the Order Pour le Mérite 1740–1918, Named and Classified by Order Levels (Die Ritter des Ordens Pour le Merite 1740-1918...) (in German). Vol. 1. Biblio. p. 601. ISBN 3-7648-2503-0.
- Philippe, Jules (1861). Historical Notice on the Abbey of Talloires (Notice historique sur l'abbaye de Talloires) (in French). Chambéry: Government Printing House. p. 288.
- Chłapowski, Dezydery (2002). The Potworowskis: Family Chronicle (Potworowscy: kronika rodzinna) (in Polish). Warsaw: DIG. p. 186. ISBN 9788371812538.
- Thory, Claude-Antoine (1815). Acta Latomorum, or Chronology of the History of French and Foreign Freemasonry (Acta Latomorum, ou chronologie de l'histoire de la franche-maçonnerie...) (in French). Vol. 2. Paris: Pierre-Elie Dufart. p. 436.
- Wonnacott, W. (1925). Exhibits. Vol. XXXVIII. Edited by W.J. Songhurst. Margate: W. J. Parrett, Ltd. p. 315.
- Francou, Michel (1988). "From Faverges to St. Petersburg (De Faverges à Saint-Pétersbourg)". Revue savoisienne (in French). 128–130. Annecy, France: Académie florimontane: 55–67.
- Kolasa, Jan (1962). International Intellectual Cooperation: The League Experience and the Beginnings of UNESCO. Prace Wrocławskiego Towarzystwa Naukowego (in French). Wrocław: Zakład Narodowy im. Ossolińskich. p. 208. ISSN 0084-3016.
- Thuillier, Guy (1971). "The Monetary Reform of 1785 (La réforme monétaire de 1785)". Annales. Économies, Sociétés, Civilisations (in French) (5). Paris: Armand Colin. doi:10.3406/ahess.1971.422391. ISSN 0395-2649.
