= Pour le Mérite =

Kingdom of Prussia's highest order of merit

Pour le Mérite (Blauer Max)
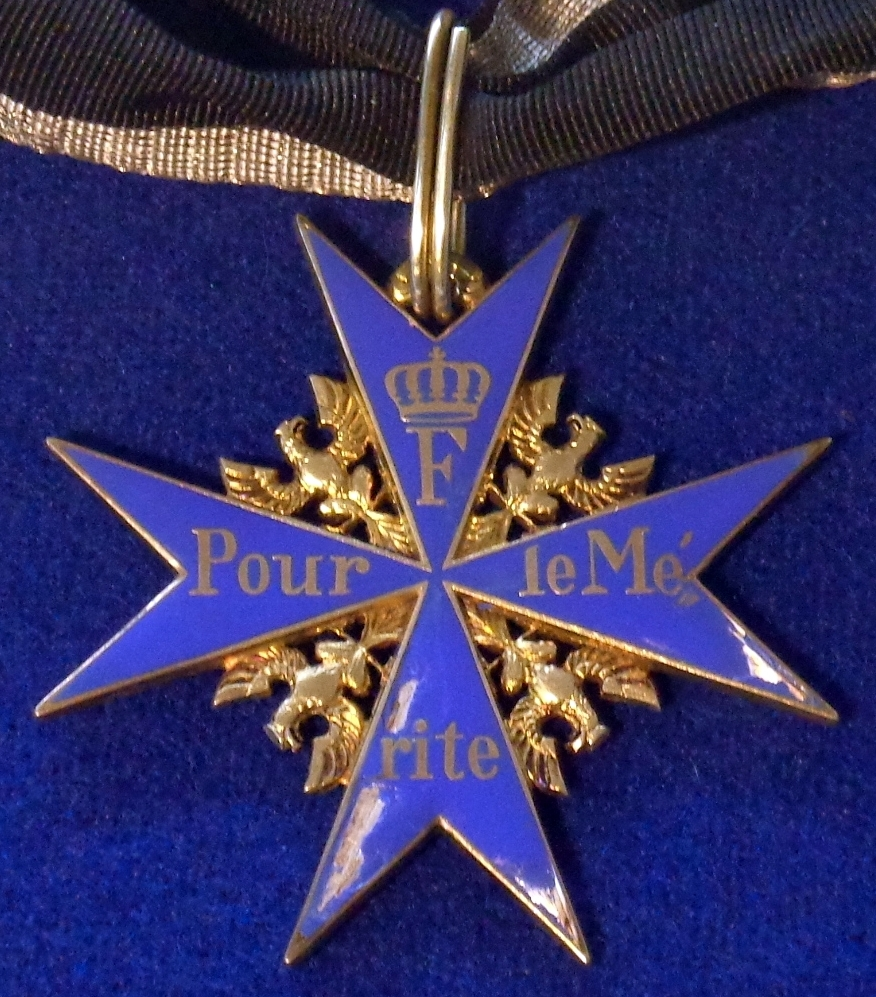
- Type: Neck decoration
- Presented by: King of Prussia (1740–1918)
- Eligibility: Military personnel (1740–1918)
- Status: Extinct
- Established: between 7 and 15 June 1740; 1810 (pure military class)
- First award: 16 June 1740
- Final award: 22 September 1918

Highlights
- Total: 5415
- Pour le Mérite Pour le Mérite with oak leaves Ribbon bars of the order

Precedence
- Next (lower): House Order of Hohenzollern

The Pour le Mérite (German: [puːɐ̯ lə meˈʁiːt]; French: [puʁ lə me.ʁit], lit. 'For Merit'), also informally known as the Blue Max (German: Blauer Max) after German WWI flying ace Max Immelmann, is an order of merit established in 1740 by King Frederick II of Prussia. Alongside the extinct Order of the Black Eagle, Order of the Red Eagle, and the House Order of Hohenzollern, the award was one of the Kingdom of Prussia's most significant, with the Pour le Mérite itself being the highest order of bravery for officers of all ranks, and the highest recognition of civilian accomplishment awarded by the Prussian Crown.

Separated into two classes, each with their own designs, the Pour le Mérite was awarded as both a military and civil honour. While the military class has been extinct since the abolition of the German Monarchy, the civil honour continues to be awarded by the German state at the oversight of the Minister of State for Culture and discretion of the Federal President. The Pour le Mérite was awarded as a recognition of extraordinary personal achievement, rather than as a general marker of social status or a courtesy-honour, although certain restrictions of social class and military rank were applied. The order was secular, and membership endured for the remaining lifetime of the recipient, unless renounced or revoked.

New awards of the military class ceased with the end of the Prussian monarchy in November 1918. German author Ernst Jünger, who died in 1998, was the last living recipient of the military class award.

A civil class for merits in sciences, humanities, and arts was established in 1842 by King Frederick William IV. The civil class was revived as an independent organization in 1923 (Pour le Mérite für Wissenschaften und Künste). Instead of the King of Prussia, the President of Germany acted as head of the order. After the Second World War, the civil class was re-established in 1952. It is this manifestation of the Pour le Mérite that remains active. The Pour le Mérite is an order into which a person is admitted, like the United Kingdom's Order of the British Empire, and is not simply a medal or state decoration.

== Military class ==
The Pour le Mérite was founded in 1740 by King Frederick II of Prussia. It was named in French, which was the leading international language and the favoured language at Frederick's court. The French name was retained, despite the rising tide of nationalism and increasing hostility between the French and Germans during the 19th century, and indeed many of its recipients were honoured for acts performed in wars against France. The insignia of the military award was a blue-enameled Maltese Cross with golden eagles between the arms (which is based on the symbol of the Johanniter Order) and the Prussian royal cypher and the words Pour le Mérite ("For Merit" in French) written in gold letters on the body of the cross. The ribbon was black with edge stripes of silver-white. The order consisted of only one class, both civil and military, until 1810. Only a few civilians were honored: Pierre Louis Maupertuis (1747), Francesco Algarotti (1747) and Voltaire (1750).

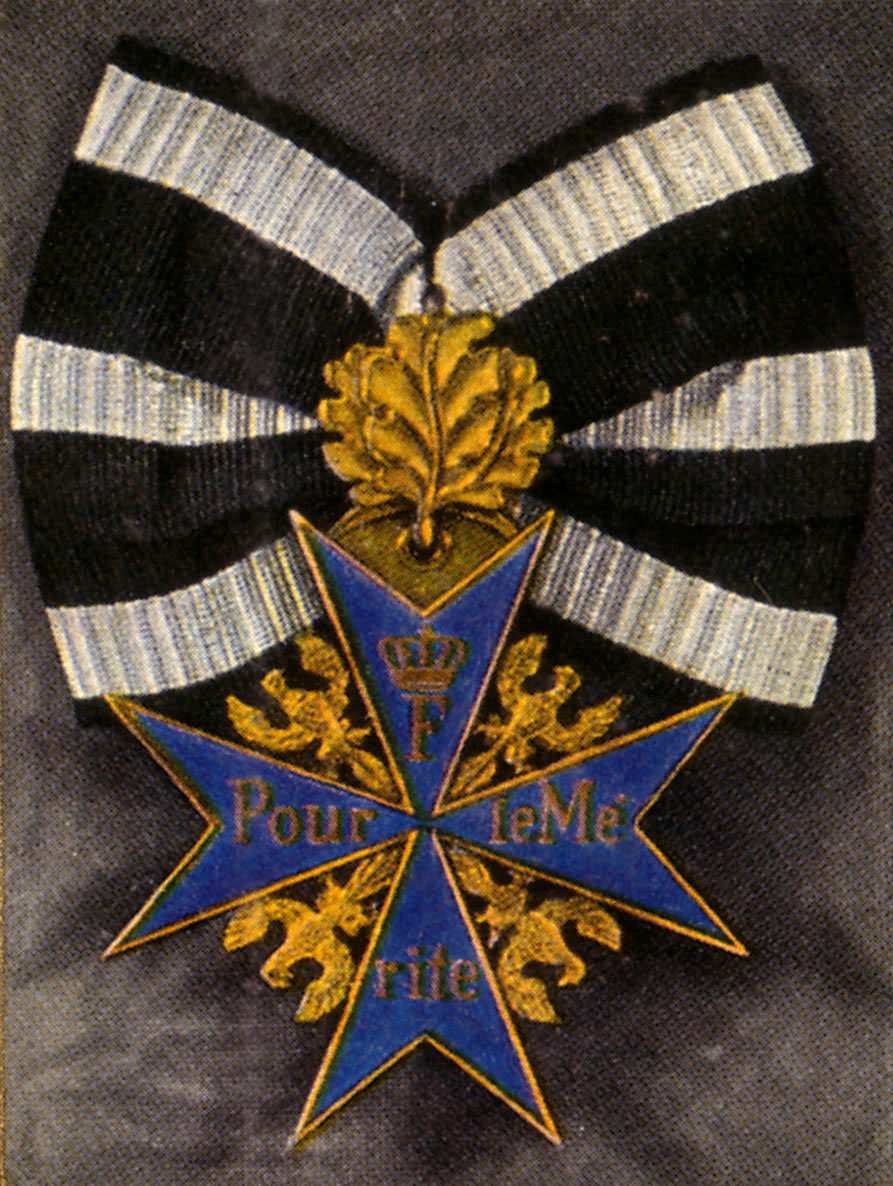
Pour le Mérite with oak leaves

In January 1810, during the Napoleonic Wars, King Frederick William III decreed that the award could be presented only to actively-serving military officers.

=== Higher Grades ===
==== Oak Leaves ====
In March 1813, the King added an additional distinction, a spray of gilt oak leaves attached above the cross. Award of the oak leaves originally indicated extraordinary achievement in battle, and was usually reserved for high-ranking officers.

The original regulations called for the capture or successful defence of a fortification, or victory in a battle. By World War I, the oak leaves often indicated a second or higher award of the Pour le Mérite, though in most cases the recipients were still high-ranking officers (usually distinguished field commanders fitting the criteria above; the few lower ranking recipients of the oak leaves were mainly general staff officers responsible for planning a victorious battle or campaign).

In early 1918, it was proposed to award the oak leaves to Germany's top flying ace, Manfred von Richthofen, but he was deemed ineligible under a strict reading of the regulations (he had already received his Pour le Mérite without oak leaves in January 1917). Instead of the oak leaves Prussia awarded von Richthofen a slightly less prestigious honor, the Order of the Red Eagle, 3rd Class with Crown and Swords. This was still a high honour, as the 3rd Class was normally awarded to colonels and lieutenant colonels and as a captain he would usually have received the 4th Class. The 3rd Class with Crown and Swords awarded to Von Richthofen was one of only two that were awarded during the entire course of World War I.

==== Crown ====
In 1844, another mark of distinction was established: a crown above the cross. A total of 147 awards are documented. Rather than being for additional merit, the crown was a 50 year jubilee recognition.

==== Grand Cross ====
In 1866, a special military Grand Cross class of the award was established. This grade of the award was given to those who, through their actions, caused the retreat or destruction of an army. As a result, the Grand Cross would be the highest class of the highest distinction awarded by the Prussian Crown.

The Grand Cross adds a portrait of Frederick the Great to the center of the cross, and also adds a crown to the head of each eagle between the arms of the cross. Furthermore, the Grand Cross came with a breast star to be worn in addition to the Grand Cross itself.

Grand Cross with Oak Leaves

The Grand Cross could, like the regular grade of the Pour le Mérite, be enhanced with its own set of oak leaves. The accompanying breast star would then also have a set of oak leaves added to it (see image courtesy of German Historical Museum).

There were only five recipients of the Grand Cross of the Pour le Mérite.

| Recipient | Pour le Mérite | Oak Leaves | Grand Gross | ... with Oak Leaves |
|---|---|---|---|---|
| Wilhelm I, King of Prussia (later German Emperor) | 27 July 1849 | 4 August 1866 | 11 November 1866 | not awarded |
| Frederick William, Crown Prince of Prussia (later German Emperor Frederick III) | 29 June 1866 | 3 August 1866 | 20 September 1866 | 2 September 1873 |
| Prince Frederick Charles of Prussia | 16 September 1848 | 27 February 1864 | 20 September 1866 | 2 September 1873 |
| Alexander II, Emperor of Russia | 8 December 1869 | 8 December 1871 | 24 April 1878 | not awarded |
| Helmuth von Moltke (the Elder) | 29 November 1839 | 17 February 1871 | 8 March 1879 | 29 November 1899* |

*this date being the 60th anniversary of his having won the Pour le Mérite, von Moltke was also granted the Crown (normally given on the 50th), along with -- in a unique distinction for this award -- Diamonds (to signify the 60th).

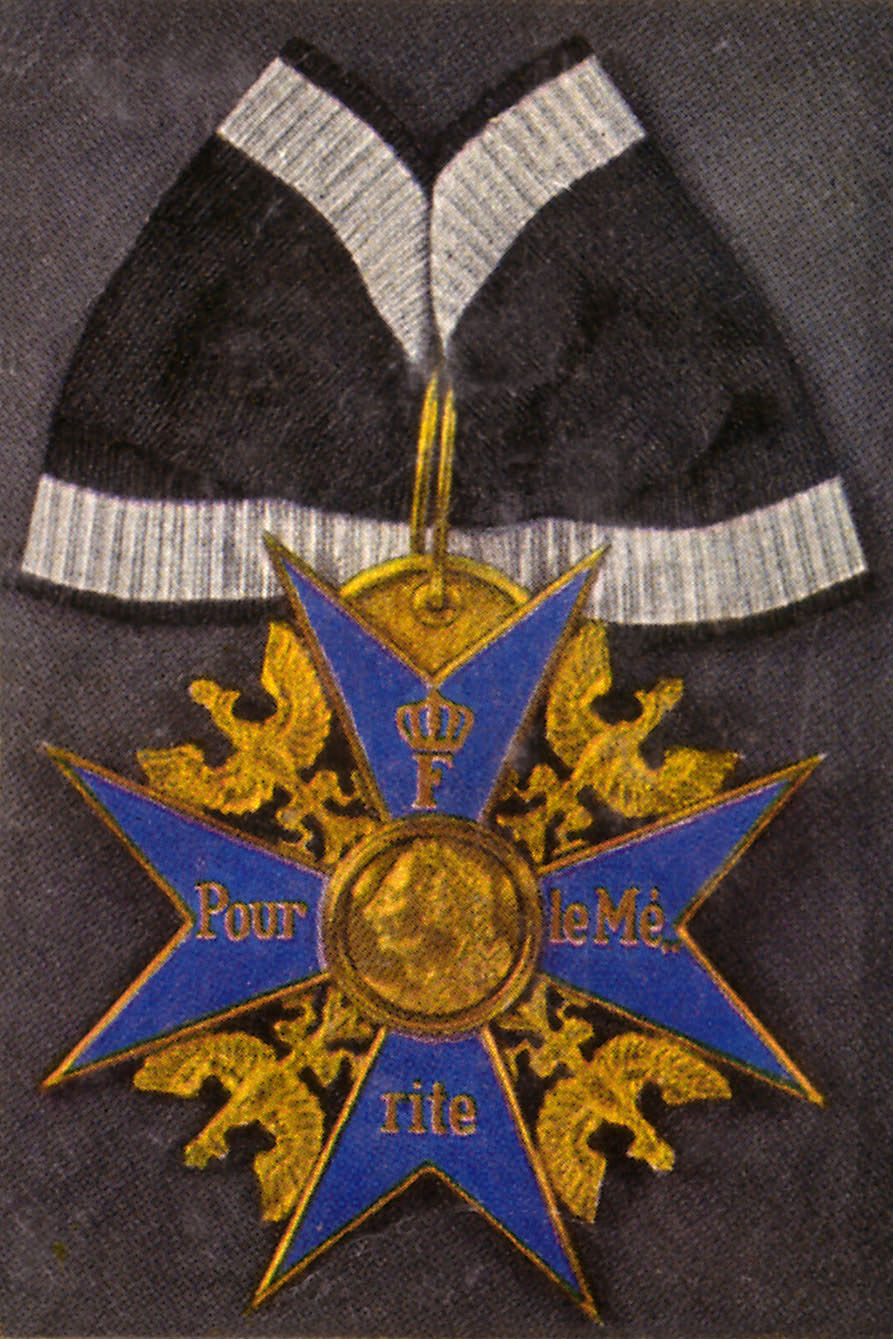
Grand Cross of the Pour le Mérite

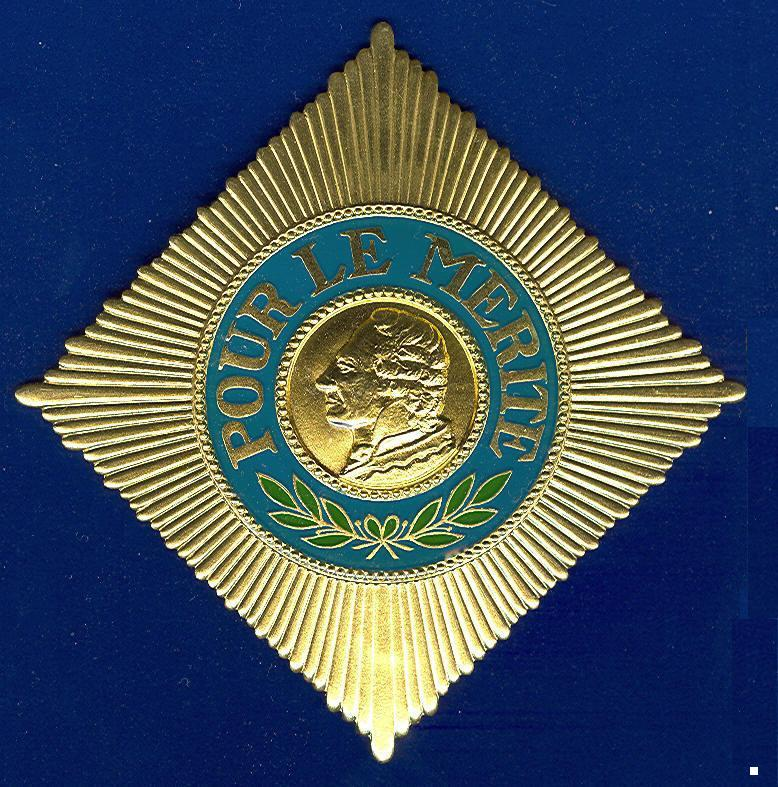
Breast star of the Grand Cross of the Pour le Mérite

=== World War I prominence ===
The Pour le Mérite gained international fame during World War I. Although it could be awarded to any military officer, its most famous recipients were the pilots of the German Army Air Service (Luftstreitkräfte), whose exploits were celebrated in wartime propaganda. In aerial warfare, a fighter pilot was initially entitled to the award upon downing eight enemy aircraft. Aces Max Immelmann and Oswald Boelcke were the first airmen to receive the award, on 12 January 1916. It was awarded to Germany's highest-scoring ace, Manfred von Richthofen, in January 1917.

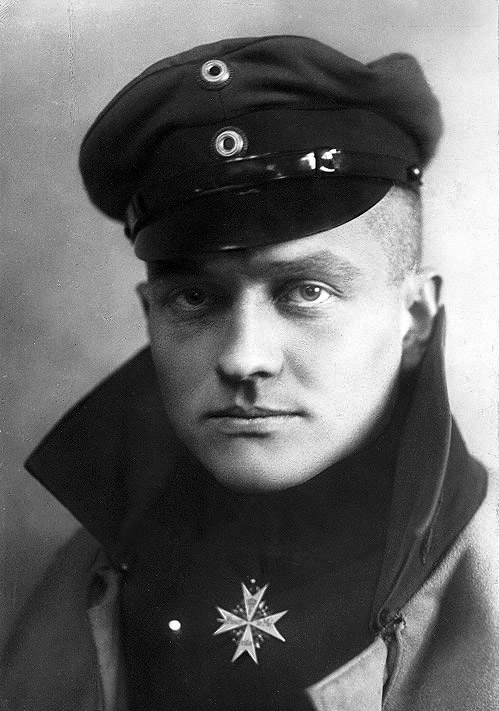
The "Red Baron" Manfred von Richthofen wears the "Blue Max".

The number of aerial victories necessary to receive the award continued to increase during the war; by early 1917, it generally required destroying 16–20 enemy airplanes, and by war's end the approximate figure was 30. However, other aviation recipients included zeppelin commanders, bomber and observation aircrews, and at least one balloon observer.

Recipients of the "Blue Max", a nickname of the order, were required to wear the award whenever in uniform. Although many of its famous recipients were junior officers, especially pilots, more than a third of all awards in World War I went to generals and admirals. Senior officer awards tended to be more for outstanding leadership in combat than for individual acts of bravery.

Junior officers (army captains and lieutenants and their navy equivalents) accounted for only about a fourth of all awards. Several famous U-boat commanders, including Lothar von Arnauld de la Perière (U-35), Walther Schwieger (U-20), Otto Hersing (U-21) and Otto Weddigen, received the Pour le Mérite.

The Pour le Mérite became extinct as a result of Kaiser Wilhelm II's abdication as king of Prussia and German Emperor on 9 November 1918. This marked the end of the Prussian monarchy and it was never awarded thereafter; however the honour continued to be recognized for, and worn by, previous recipients.

=== Notable recipients of the military class ===
==== 1740 to 1871 ====
- Henning Alexander von Kleist. Prussian general, awarded Pour le Mérite in 1741 by Frederick II for actions during Battle of Mollwitz during War of Austrian Succession.
- Isaac de Forcade de Biaix, Prussian colonel and later Hofmarschall to the Prince of Prussia Frederick William II, heir to the throne of Prussia, awarded on 11 June 1742, as a captain with the 18th Prussian Infantry Regiment (von Derschau) for his actions during the First Silesian War.
- Friedrich Wilhelm Quirin von Forcade de Biaix, Prussian lieutenant general, awarded on 6 January 1746 as a colonel for his actions in the Second Silesian War on the battlefield during the Battle of Soor, the victory of which Frederick the Great attributed to him.
- Carl Heinrich von Wedel, awarded the Pour le Mérite 1752
- Friedrich Wilhelm von Seydlitz, awarded 1757, during the Seven Years' War.
- Charles-Emmanuel de Warnery. Major General. Cavalry. In October 1756 for actions at the Battle of Lobositz.
- Peter III of Russia, who received the Pour le Mérite in 1762 when he withdrew Russia from the Seven Years' War and made peace with Prussia.
- Gebhard von Blücher, awarded on 4 June 1789, Napoleonic-era Prussian field marshal who led Prussian forces at the Battle of Waterloo.
- Alexander Suvorov, Russian generalissimo, awarded on 28 December 1794.
- Charles Osipovich Ode-de-Sion, Russian major, awarded on 28 February 1795.
- Gerhard von Scharnhorst, Napoleonic-era Prussian general.
- Friedrich Wilhelm Freiherr von Bülow, Napoleonic-era Prussian general; also received the oak leaves.
- Karl Friedrich von dem Knesebeck, Napoleonic-era Prussian general (later field marshal); first decorated in 1807, received the oak leaves in 1814.
- Karl Wilhelm Georg von Grolman, Napoleonic-era Prussian general; also received the oak leaves.
- Ludwig Graf Yorck von Wartenburg, Napoleonic-era Prussian general (later field marshal); also received the oak leaves.
- August von Gneisenau, Napoleonic-era Prussian general (later field marshal); first decorated in 1807, received the oak leaves in 1814.
- Hermann von Boyen, Napoleonic-era Prussian general and Minister of War; simultaneously received the Pour le Mérite and the oak leaves.
- Ernst von Pfuel, Prussian general and Prime Minister of Prussia; decorated in 1814 during the Napoleonic Wars, received the oak leaves in 1831.
- Helmuth Graf von Moltke, known as "Moltke the Elder"; first decorated in 1839 as a junior officer; he received the oak leaves in 1871 and the Grand Cross in March 1879. Also inducted into the civil class of the order in 1874.
- Leonhard Graf von Blumenthal, Prussian general (later field marshal) decorated with the Pour le Mérite in the 1864 German-Danish War and the oak leaves in the 1866 Austro-Prussian War.

==== 1871 to 1914 ====
- Otto von Bismarck, Prussian minister president and German chancellor during the unification period; decorated in 1884 with the Pour le Mérite with oak leaves. Also inducted into the civil class of the order in 1896.
- Leo von Caprivi, Prussian general, decorated in 1871 for merit in the Franco-Prussian War.
- Alfred Graf von Waldersee, German field marshal, decorated August 1901 with the Pour le Mérite with oak leaves for his services as Allied Supreme Commander in China 1900–1901

==== 1914 to 1918 (World War I) ====
===== German air force =====
- Max Immelmann, German flying ace with 15 aerial victories, one of the first aviator recipients along with Oswald Boelcke and namesake of the "Blue Max" and Immelmann turn.
- Oswald Boelcke, German flying ace with 40 aerial victories, one of the first aviator recipients along with Max Immelmann.
- Wilhelm Frankl, German flying ace with 20 victories, one of the first German Jewish recipients in World War I.
- Hermann Göring, decorated as an ace pilot for continuous courage in action in June 1918, finishing World War I with 22 air victories and later the third and final commander of Jagdgeschwader I
- Manfred von Richthofen, better known as the "Red Baron", the top-scoring ace of World War I with 80 aerial victories and the first commander of Jagdgeschwader I.
- Lothar von Richthofen, German flying ace with 40 victories. Younger brother of Manfred Von Richthofen.
- Ernst Udet, second-highest-scoring German ace of World War I with 62 victories.
- Erich Loewenhardt, third-highest-scoring German ace of World War I with 54 victories.
- Werner Voss, fourth-highest-scoring German ace of World War I, credited with 48 victories.
- Josef Jacobs, German flying ace with 48 victories. His total tied him with Werner Voss.
- Kurt Wintgens, the first military aviator ever to down an enemy aircraft with a synchronized machine gun. Credited with 22 aerial victories.
- Bruno Loerzer, German flying ace with 44 victories.
- Julius Buckler, German flying ace with 36 victories.
- Gotthard Sachsenberg, German flying ace with 31 victories.
- Kurt Wolff, German flying ace with 33 victories.
- Heinrich Kroll, German flying ace with 33 victories.
- Rudolf Berthold, high-ranking German ace with 44 victories, Was shot to death by German communists in 1920.
- Robert Ritter von Greim, World War I ace with 28 victories and World War II field marshal.
- Eduard Ritter von Schleich, better known as the "Black Knight", destroyed 35 enemy aircraft.
- Carl Menckhoff, fighter ace, with 39 confirmed victories.
- Paul Bäumer, fighter ace with 43 confirmed victories.
- Ernst von Hoeppner, Commanding General of the Air Service.
- Josef Veltjens, German fighter ace, with 35 confirmed victories as lieutenant (reserve).
- Fritz Pütter, German flying ace with 25 victories.
- Franz Büchner, German flying ace with 40 victories.
- Friedrich Ritter von Röth, flying ace with 28 confirmed victories, was Germany's top Balloon buster of World War I with 20 observer balloons shot down.
- Heinrich Gontermann, Ace pilot credited with shooting down 21 aircraft and 18 observation balloons. He was Germany's second best Balloon buster of World War I.
- Hans Joachim Buddecke, German fighter ace in World War I, credited with thirteen victories. He was the third ace, after Max Immelmann and Oswald Boelcke, to earn Pour le Mérite. He fought in Gallipoli to fly the Halberstadt D.II and Fokker E.III with Ottoman FA 6 against the Royal Naval Air Service. The Turkish campaign was successful, with four confirmed victories and seven unconfirmed, and Buddecke was personally awarded the Gold Liakat Medal by Enver Pasha.

===== German army =====
- Erwin Rommel, decorated as an Oberleutnant in December 1917 for service in Italy
- Paul von Hindenburg, German field marshal and later President of Germany; awarded the Pour le Mérite in September 1914 and the oak leaves in February 1915.
- Erich Ludendorff, German general of World War I; awarded the Pour le Mérite in August 1914, one of the earliest World War I awards, for the Siege of Liège, Belgium; received the oak leaves in February 1915.
- Rupprecht, Crown Prince of Bavaria, German field marshal; awarded the Pour le Mérite in August 1915 and the oak leaves in December 1916.
- Albrecht, Duke of Württemberg, German field marshal; awarded the Pour le Mérite in August 1915 and the oak leaves in February 1918.
- Werner von Blomberg, decorated as a major in June 1918 and later a Field Marshal General in the Wehrmacht.
- Fedor von Bock, Awarded Pour le Mérite in 1918 for efforts of leading his battalion at the Somme and Cambrai. Later Field Marshal and commander of Army Group North, Polish campaign, 1939. Commander Army Group B in conquest of Western Europe 1940. Commander Army Group Centre in Russia 1941. Commander Army Group South in Russian Ukraine and Caucasus 1942.
- Erich von Falkenhayn, Chief of the German General Staff from 1914 to 1916; awarded the Pour le Mérite in February 1915 and the oak leaves in June 1915.
- Oskar von Hutier, German general awarded the Pour le Mérite in September 1917 and the oak leaves in March 1918.
- Georg Bruchmüller, German colonel and artillery officer in von Hutier's 8th Army.
- Paul von Lettow-Vorbeck, German general who led the German Schutztruppe in the guerrilla campaign in German East Africa; awarded the Pour le Mérite in November 1916 and the oak leaves in October 1917.
- Otto Liman von Sanders, German general who served as adviser and commander of Ottoman forces in World War I; awarded the Pour le Mérite and the oak leaves simultaneously in January 1916 for his role in the Battle of Gallipoli.
- Fritz von Lossberg, World War I master-strategist; expert in the Defence in depth. Awarded 21 September 1916 (Somme); oak leaves on 24 April 1917 (Arras).
- August von Mackensen, German general (later field marshal) of World War I; awarded the Pour le Mérite in November 1914 and the oak leaves in June 1915.
- Helmuth Johann Ludwig von Moltke, Chief of the German General Staff at the outbreak of World War I. Nephew of Moltke the Elder.
- Friedrich Freiherr Kress von Kressenstein, German officer in the Near East campaigns of World War I.
- Otto von Garnier, German General of the Cavalry awarded the Pour le Mérite in October 1916.
- Max Hoffmann, German staff officer; awarded the Pour le Mérite in October 1916 and the oak leaves in July 1917.
- Hans von Seeckt, German staff officer in World War I; awarded the Pour le Mérite in May 1915 and the oak leaves in November 1915.
- Ernst Jünger, Army Lieutenant and later novelist, the last living holder of the Pour le Mérite at the time of his death in 1998.
- Ferdinand Schörner, decorated as a Leutnant in December 1917, later a field marshal in World War II.
- Heinrich Kirchheim, Company Commander of Jäger-Bataillon Number 10 and a Generalleutnant in World War II. Awarded in October 1918.
- Johann von Ravenstein, German officer. In May 1918 his battalion broke through the opposing line at Soissons. After capturing the notorious Chemin des Dames, he succeeded, with 10 soldiers, in capturing the bridge over the Aisne at Bourg intact. His troops took 1500 prisoners and captured 32 cannons. Later served in the Afrika Korps.
- Alexander von Falkenhausen, German colonel, for victories in two battles in Jordan on March and May 1918 against Allied troops.

===== German navy =====
- Henning von Holtzendorff, German Grand Admiral, decorated in March 1916.
- Alfred von Tirpitz, German Grand Admiral, decorated in August 1915.
- Reinhard Scheer, German admiral and commander of German naval forces in the Battle of Jutland.
- Franz Hipper, German admiral.
- Nikolaus Burggraf und Graf zu Dohna-Schlodien, German auxiliary cruiser commander; one of only two junior officers to receive the highest military honors of the five main German states.
- Karl August Nerger, German auxiliary cruiser commander; one of only two junior officers to receive the highest military honors of the five main German states.
- Karl Friedrich Max von Müller, captain of the famous German commerce raider, the light cruiser Emden during the first few months of World War I.
- Felix von Luckner, captain of the Seeadler, a sailing ship used as a commerce raider.
- Lothar von Arnauld de la Perière, German U-boat commander during the First World War, awarded the Pour le Mérite in the autumn of 1916 for sinking 200,000 tonnes of Allied shipping.
- Hans Rose, successful German U-boat Ace Kapitänleutnant U53 81 victories, awarded December 20, 1917
- Walther Forstmann, successful German U-boat Ace and later staff officer in the Kriegsmarine.
- Walther Schwieger, German U-boat commander who sank the British liner RMS Lusitania.
- Wilhelm Anton Souchon, German Vice Admiral serving in the Black Sea in World War I.
- Theo Osterkamp, Naval observer and later a fighter pilot who claimed 32 victories in World War I. He also scored six victories in World War II and became an air force general.
- Otto Weddigen, German U-boat commander of World War I.
- Friedrich Christiansen, decorated as Naval Pilot with 13 victories and 8 shared, Oberleutnant on 11 December 1917.
- Otto Hersing, commander of U-21, the first U-boat to sink an enemy ship using a self-propelled locomotive torpedo. Awarded on 5 June 1915.
- Paul Behncke, German admiral.

== Civil class ==
Pour le Mérite (Civil class)
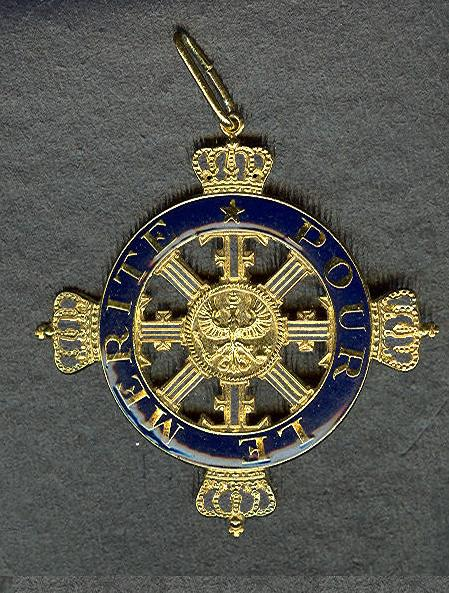
- Type: Order of Merit
- Established: 31 May 1842 (separate class); 1952 (re-established)
- Country: Kingdom of Prussia; West Germany; Germany
- Eligibility: Domestic and foreign persons
- Awarded for: Men and women who through widespread recognition for their contributions to science and art have made an eminent name for themselves
- Status: Extant
- Founder: Frederick William IV of Prussia
- Chancellor: Hermann Parzinger
- Website: www.orden-pourlemerite.de

Statistics
- First induction: 31 May 1842 (separate class)
- Ribbon bar of the order

In 1842, King Frederick William IV of Prussia, appointed Alexander von Humboldt as Chancellor of the Order of Merit with powers to recommend candidates to this new civil class of the Order Pour le Mérite for Sciences and Arts (Orden Pour le Mérite für Wissenschaften und Künste), with the three sections: humanities, natural science and fine arts. When a vacancy occurred the Academy of Arts and Sciences nominated three candidates, one of whom the king appointed.

In November 1918 the Kingdom of Prussia came to an end, and with it that state's sponsorship of the Pour le Mérite. However, unlike the military class of the order, the class of the order for achievements in the arts and sciences did not come to an end. The members re-established their order as an autonomous organization, with revised rules and processes for nomination.

The awarding of new memberships resumed in 1923. Recipients included Albert Einstein (1923), Käthe Kollwitz (1929) and Ernst Barlach (1933).

During the era of National Socialism in Germany (1933–45), the order was re-absorbed into the state honours system, and the list of its members was reviewed and revised according to the policies of the new government. A number of Jews and other perceived dissidents or "enemies" of the state were deprived of their awards by the Nazi regime. They included Einstein (who resigned his membership in the order in 1933, and refused invitations to renew it after the war), Kollwitz, and Barlach. Such actions were later repudiated by both the order and the postwar German government.

In 1952, the order was re-established again in West Germany with assistance of Federal President Theodor Heuss – now as an independent organization with state recognition and the President of the German Federal Republic as Protector of the Order. However, unlike the somewhat similar Bundesverdienstkreuz (Federal Cross of Merit), also established by Heuss, it is not a state order.

The revived civil order of the Pour le Mérite is awarded for achievements in the arts and sciences. Active membership is limited to 40 German citizens, ten each in the fields of humanities, natural science, and medicine and the arts. Honorary membership can be conferred on foreigners, again to the limit of 40. When a vacancy occurs, the remaining members select a new inductee.

=== Notable recipients of the civil class ===
Among famous recipients of the civil class of the Pour le Mérite in the first group of awards in 1842 were Alexander von Humboldt, Carl Friedrich Gauss, Jakob Grimm, Felix Mendelssohn, Friedrich Wilhelm Joseph Schelling and August Wilhelm Schlegel. Foreign recipients in the "class of 1842" included François-René de Chateaubriand, Michael Faraday and Franz Liszt.

Later recipients included Theodor Mommsen (1868), Charles Darwin (1868), Thomas Carlyle (1874), Emil du Bois-Reymond (1877), William Thomson, Lord Kelvin (1884), Joseph Lister (1885), Johannes Brahms (1887), Giuseppe Verdi (1887), Hubert von Herkomer (1899), Camille Saint-Saëns (1901), John Singer Sargent (1908), Ferdinand von Zeppelin (1910), Wilhelm Conrad Röntgen (1911), Sir William Ramsay (1911), and Max Planck (1915).

New members of the revised order in 1923 included Albert Einstein (1923), Gerhart Hauptmann (1923), Richard Strauss (1924), Wilhelm Furtwängler (1929), and Käthe Kollwitz (1929).

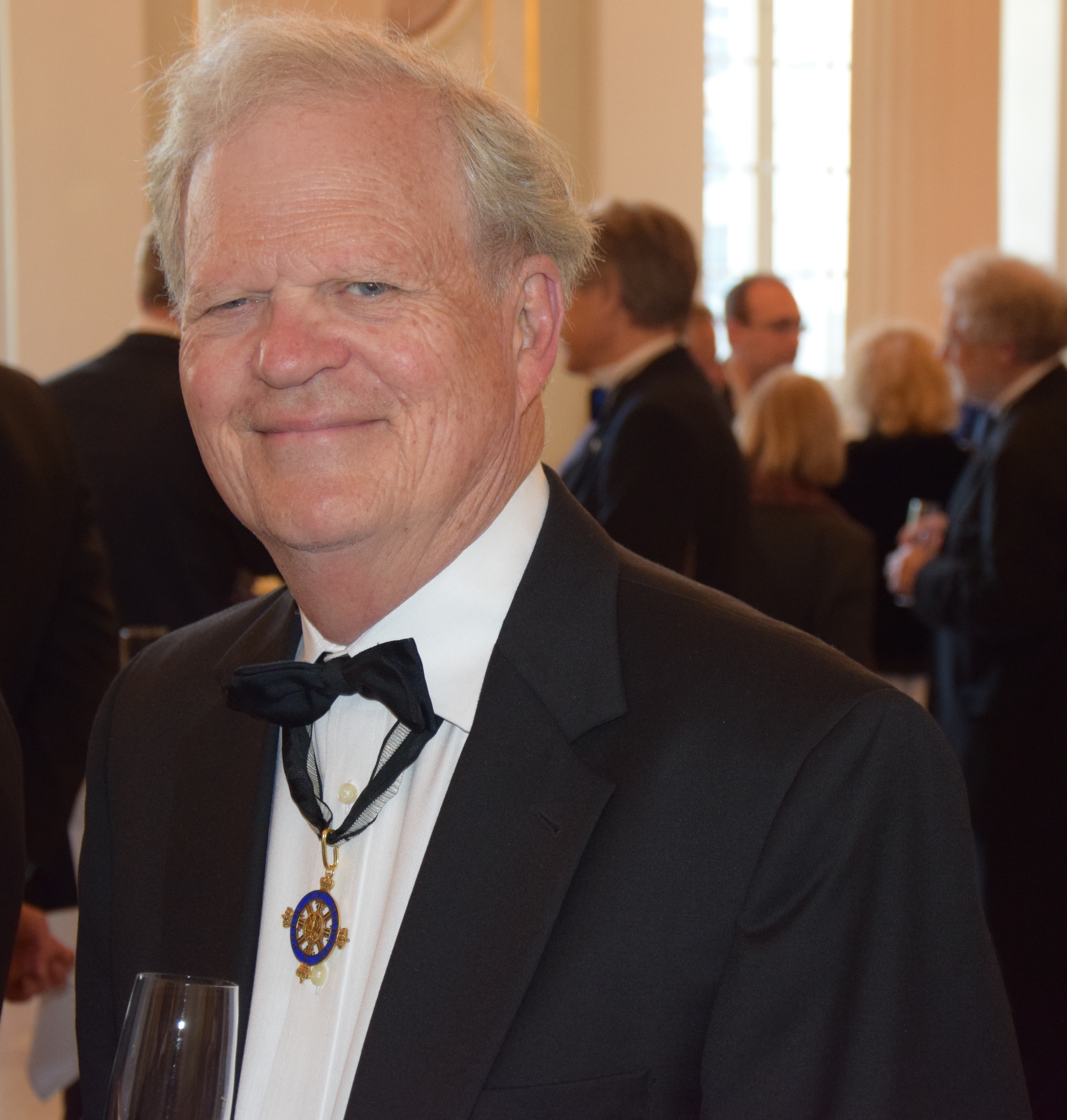
James J. Sheehan wearing his Pour le Mérite in 2014

Among those inducted in 1952 were Otto Heinrich Warburg, Otto Hahn, Paul Hindemith, and Emil Nolde.

Later recipients include Arthur Compton (1954), Hermann Hesse (1954), Albert Schweitzer (1954), Thomas Mann (1955), Oskar Kokoschka (1955), Carl Orff (1956), Erwin Schrödinger (1956), Thornton Wilder (1956), Werner Heisenberg (1957), Lise Meitner (1957), Ludwig Mies van der Rohe (1957), Felix Bloch (1959), Carl Friedrich von Weizsäcker (1961), Karl Jaspers (1964), Otto Klemperer (1967), Carl Zuckmayer (1967), Henry Moore (1972), Karl Popper (1980), Carlos Kleiber (1990), Witold Lutosławski (1993), Rudolf Mößbauer (1996), Christiane Nüsslein-Volhard (1997), Umberto Eco (1998), Hans Magnus Enzensberger (1999), Wim Wenders (2005), James J. Sheehan (2006), and Svante Pääbo (2008).

More recent recipients were Gidon Kremer (2016), Emmanuelle Charpentier (2017), Heinz Holliger (2018), Sir Christopher Clark (2019), Herta Müller (2021), and Peter Gülke (2022).

As of 2025, 17 Nobel Prize laureates are member of the order.

=== Similar orders in other countries ===
Besides Prussia, several other states of the former German Empire also conferred similar awards for the arts and sciences. These included the Kingdom of Bavaria's Maximilian Order for Art and Science (Maximiliansorden für Kunst und Wissenschaft), the Duchy of Anhalt's Order of Merit for Science and Art (Verdienstorden für Wissenschaft und Kunst), and the Principality of Lippe's Lippe Rose Order for Art and Science (Lippische Rose, Orden für Kunst und Wissenschaft).

A number of other countries have founded similar high civic honours for accomplishments in the arts and sciences. The sovereign of the Commonwealth realms confers the Order of Merit and Order of the Companions of Honour. The Republic of Austria confers the Austrian Decoration of Honour for Science and the Arts, founded in 1955. Like the Order Pour le Mérite for Sciences and Arts, this was in a sense a revival of an earlier imperial award, in this case the Austro-Hungarian Decoration of Honour for Art and Science (Österreichisch-Ungarisches Ehrenzeichen für Kunst und Wissenschaft), which existed from 1887 to 1918. Unlike the German award, the design of the modern Austrian award is unlike that of its imperial predecessor. France has the Ordre des Arts et des Lettres for significant contributions to the arts and literature. In Poland the Gloria Artis Medal has been established for the same purpose.

Other countries also may recognise accomplishments in the arts and sciences, but with more general orders also awarded for accomplishments in other fields. France's Légion d'honneur is an example of a decoration often conferred for accomplishment in many fields, including the arts and sciences. Belgium awards either its Order of Leopold or Order of the Crown for outstanding accomplishments in the arts and sciences, and may award its Civil Decoration for lesser accomplishments in these fields.

== Recipients of both classes ==
Only a small number of persons have received both the military and civil classes of the Pour le Mérite:

- Helmuth von Moltke the Elder, military class 1839, civil class 1874
- Otto von Bismarck, military class 1884, civil class 1896
- Hermann von Kuhl, military class 1916, civil class 1924

== See also ==
- Pour le Mérite (film)
- The Blue Max, a 1966 film
