= Badenweiler (disambiguation) =

Badenweiler may refer to:

- Badenweiler, spa community in Germany
- Badenweiler Marsch, military march
- Badonviller, town and commune in France
