= List of terms used for Germans =

There are many terms for the German people; in English, the demonym, or noun, is German. During the early Renaissance, "German" implied that the person spoke German as a native language. Until the German unification, people living in the Germany to come were named for the region in which they lived: Examples are Bavarians and Brandenburgers.

Some terms are humorous or pejorative slang, and used mainly by people from other countries, although they can be used in a self-deprecating way by German people themselves. Other terms are serious or tongue-in-cheek attempts to coin words as alternatives to the ambiguous standard terms.

Many pejorative terms for Germans in various countries originated during the two World Wars.

== English ==
=== Hun (pejorative) ===
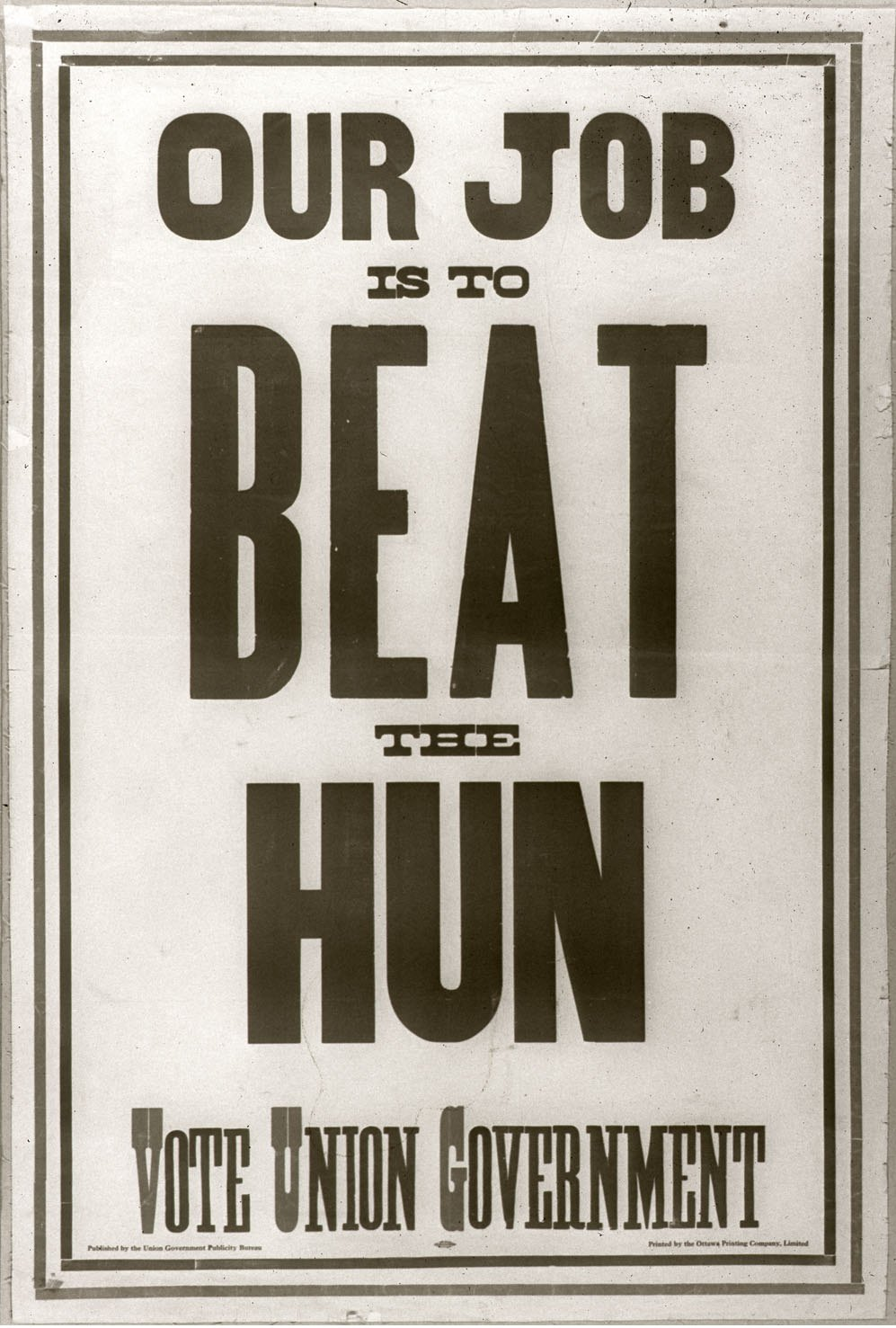
A First World War Canadian electoral campaign poster

Hun (or The Hun) is a term that originally refers to the nomadic Huns of the Migration Period. Beginning in World War I it became an often used pejorative seen on war posters by Western Allied powers and the basis for a characterization of the Germans as barbaric criminals with no respect for civilization and humanitarian values. Although the common association of the term is with the First World War, the term had been used throughout the preceding decades, including the Franco-Prussian War and Second Boer War.

The wartime association of the term with Germans is believed to have been inspired by an earlier address to Imperial German troops by Kaiser Wilhelm II. What is dubbed the "Hun speech" (Hunnenrede) was delivered on 27 July 1900, when he bade farewell to the German expeditionary corps sailing from the port of Bremerhaven to take part in suppressing the Boxer Rebellion. The relevant part of the speech was:

Kommt ihr vor den Feind, so wird derselbe geschlagen! Pardon wird nicht gegeben! Gefangene werden nicht gemacht! Wer euch in die Hände fällt, sei euch verfallen! Wie vor tausend Jahren die Hunnen unter ihrem König Etzel sich einen Namen gemacht, der sie noch jetzt in Überlieferung und Märchen gewaltig erscheinen läßt, so möge der Name Deutsche in China auf 1000 Jahre durch euch in einer Weise bestätigt werden, daß es niemals wieder ein Chinese wagt, einen Deutschen scheel anzusehen!

When you come face to face with the enemy, he will be defeated! No quarter will be given! No prisoners will be taken! Whoever falls into your hands is forfeit to you! Just as the Huns under their king Attila made a name for themselves a thousand years ago, a name that still makes them appear mighty in legend and folklore, so may the name "German" in China be confirmed by you for a thousand years, so that no Chinese person will ever again dare to look askance at a German!

The theme of Hunnic savagery was then developed in a speech of August Bebel in the Reichstag in which he recounted details of the cruelty of the German expedition which were taken from soldiers' letters home, styled the Hunnenbriefe (letters from the Huns). The Kaiser's speech was widely reported in the European press at that time.

==== In World War I ====
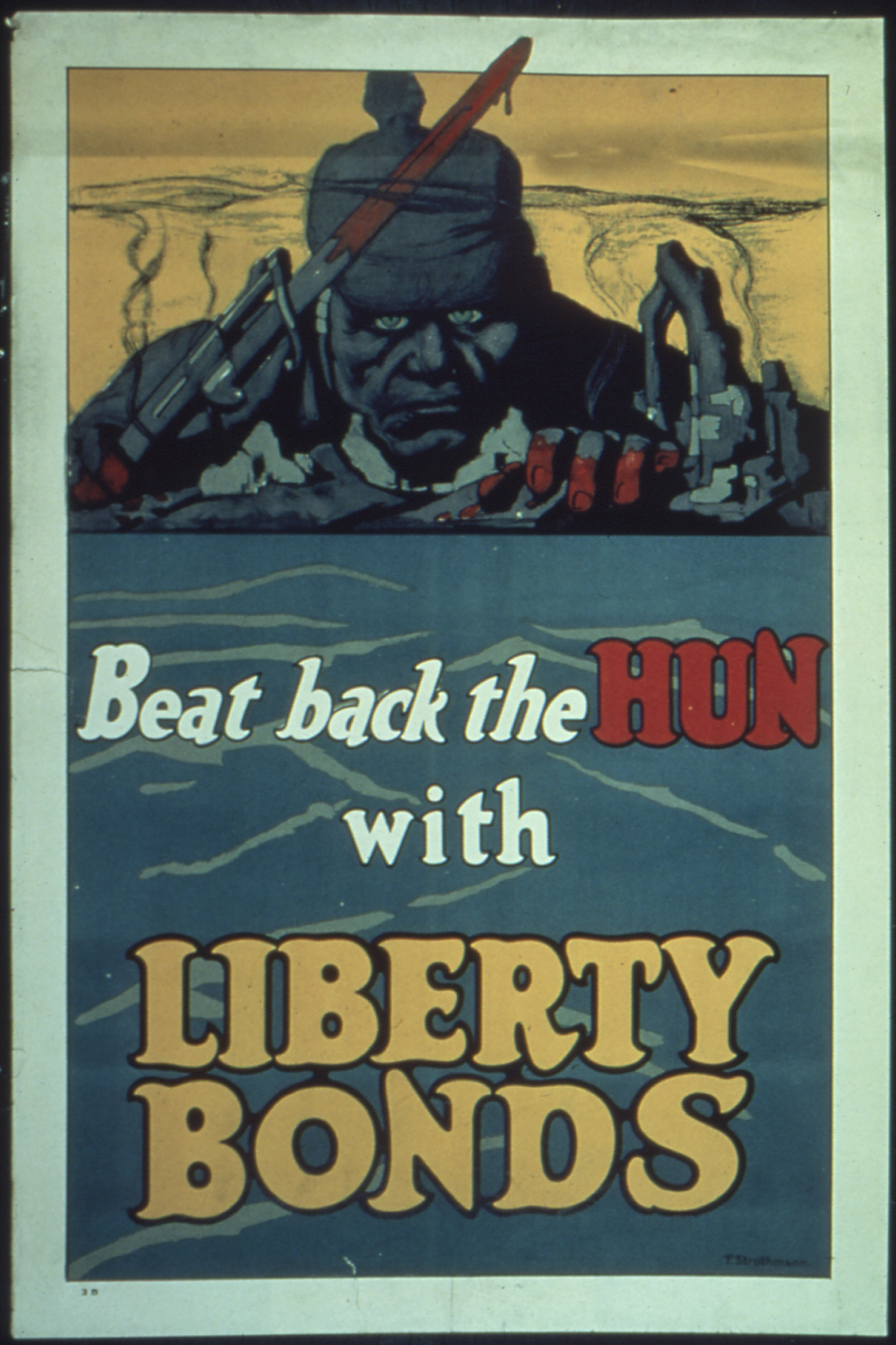
An American World War I fundraising poster

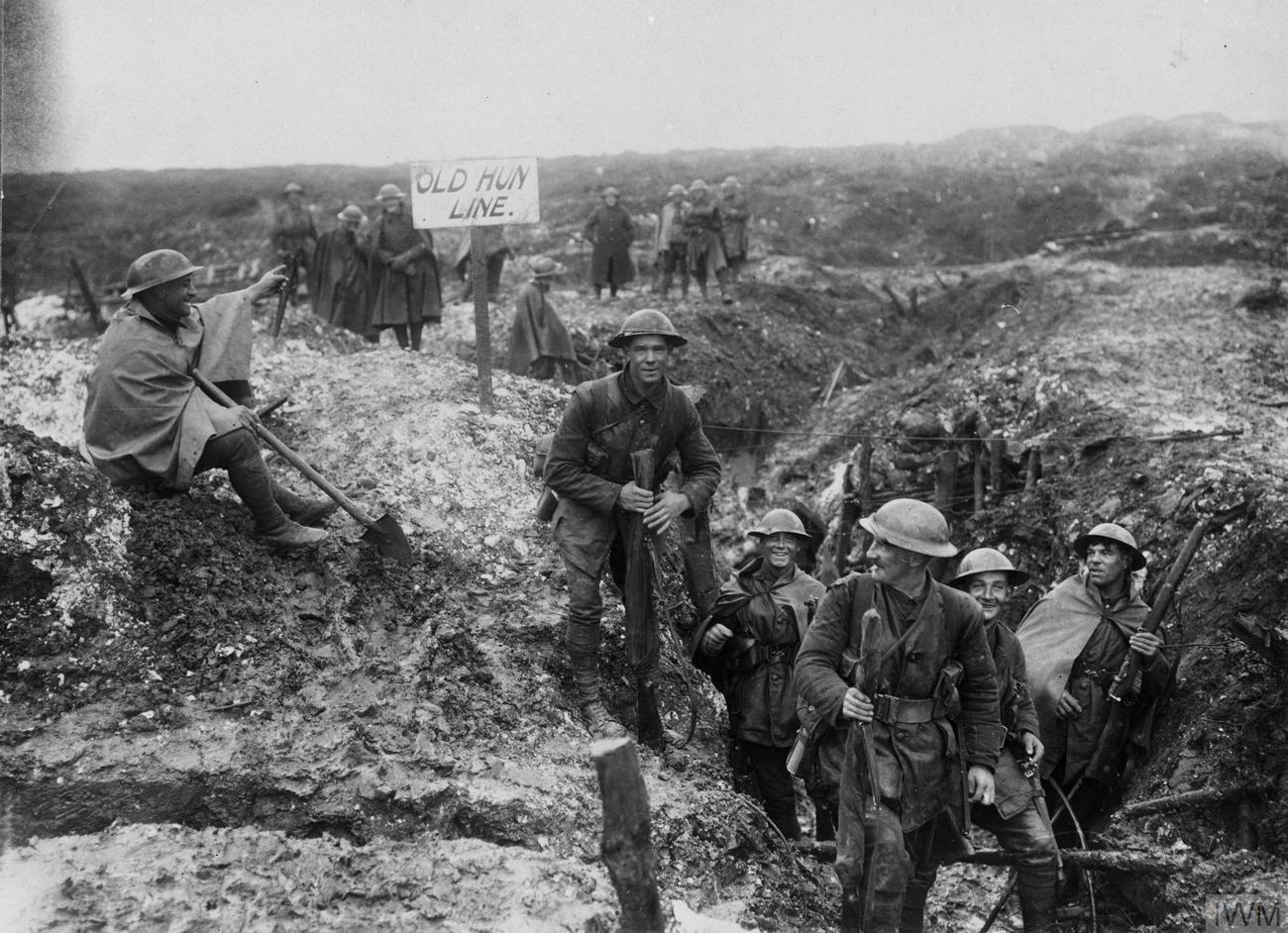
A captured German trench during World War I with a sign "OLD HUN LINE"

The term "Hun" from this speech was later used for the Germans by British and other Allied propaganda during the war. The comparison was helped by the spiked Pickelhaube helmet worn by German forces until 1916, which would be reminiscent of images depicting ancient warrior helmets (not necessarily that of actual historical Huns). This usage, emphasising the idea that the Germans were barbarians, was reinforced by the propaganda utilised throughout the war. The French songwriter Théodore Botrel described the Kaiser as "an Attila, without remorse", launching "cannibal hordes". By coincidence, Gott mit uns ("God is with us"), a motto first used in the Kingdom of Prussia and later the German Empire, may have contributed to the popularisation of 'Huns' as British Army slang for Germans by misreading 'uns' for 'Huns'.

==== In World War II ====
The usage of the term "Hun" to describe Germans resurfaced during World War II, although less frequently than in the previous war. For example in 1941, Winston Churchill said in a broadcast speech: "There are less than 70,000,000 malignant Huns, some of whom are curable and others killable, most of whom are already engaged in holding down Austrians, Czechs, Poles and the many other ancient races they now bully and pillage." Later that year Churchill referred to the invasion of the Soviet Union as "the dull, drilled, docile brutish masses of the Hun soldiery, plodding on like a swarm of crawling locusts." During this time American President Franklin D. Roosevelt also referred to the German people in this way, saying that an Allied invasion into Southern France would surely "be successful and of great assistance to Eisenhower in driving the Huns from France."

=== Fritz ===
British soldiers employed a variety of epithets for the Germans. Fritz, a German pet-form of Friedrich, was popular in both World War I and World War II.

=== Heinie (pejorative) ===
The Americans and Canadians referred to Germans, especially German soldiers, as Heinies, from a diminutive of the common German male proper name Heinrich. For example, in the film 1941 the Slim Pickens character calls a German officer "Mr Hynee Kraut!".

Heinie is also a colloquial term for buttocks, in use since the 1920s. In German, Heini is a common colloquial term with a slightly pejorative meaning similar to "moron" or "idiot", but has a different origin.

=== Japanazi (pejorative) ===
During World War II, the slur Japanazi was developed as a combination of the words Japan and Nazi, used as discriminatory words against both the Japanese and Germans for being the driving forces and brutalities in the same war. The word was popularised in a 1943 propaganda cartoon, Tokio Jokio.

=== Jerry ===
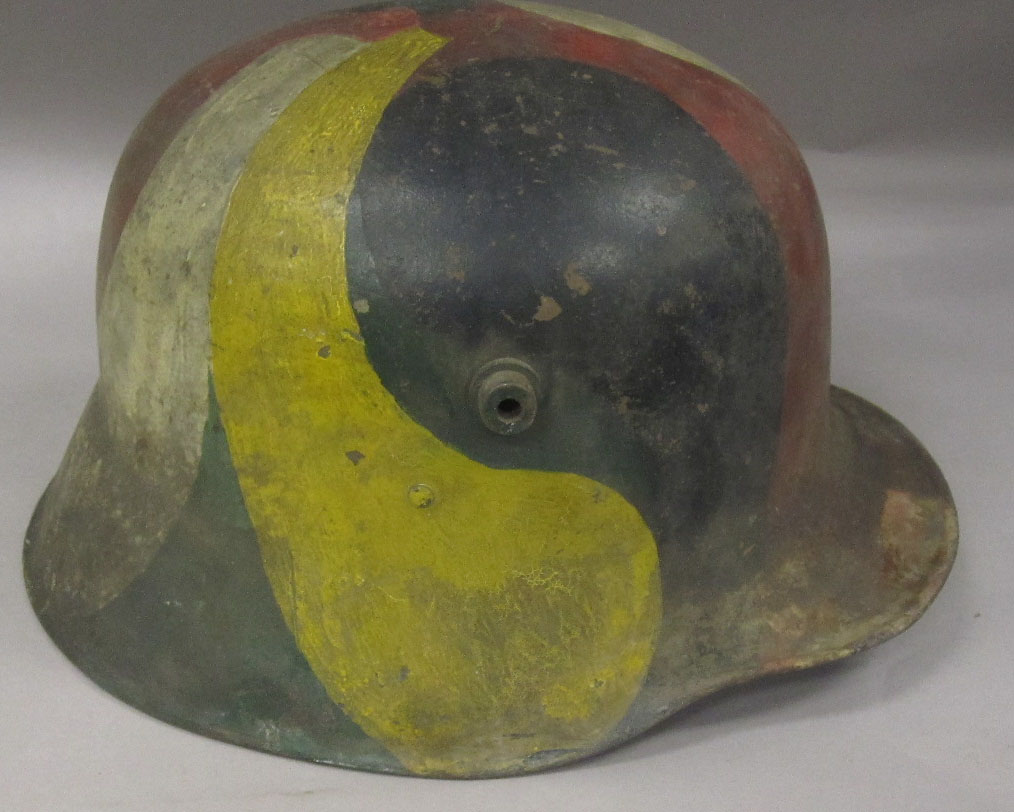
World War I Stahlhelm, said by the British to resemble a chamber pot

Jerry was a nickname given to Germans mostly during the Second World War by soldiers and civilians of the Allied nations, in particular by the British. The nickname was originally created during World War I. The term is the basis for the name of the jerrycan.

The name may simply be an alteration of the word German. Alternatively, Jerry may possibly be derived from the stahlhelm introduced in 1916, which was said by British soldiers to resemble a "jerry" (chamber pot).

=== Kraut (pejorative) ===
Kraut is a German word recorded in English from 1918 onwards as a derogatory term for a German, particularly a German soldier during World War I. The term came up after the American entry into World War I, which followed the Turnip Winter and had resulted in the food trade stop for Germany through neutral states. The analogy of this term is the starving soldier of World War I, who ran out of supplies for a long war-period and needed to eat wild cabbage.

Before the Second World War the term was used in relation to cabbage, because anti-German boycotts and de facto trade limitations hit Germany's food imports. Early American war propaganda used the language in such a manner that 'Kraut' and 'Krauthead' gave the Germans less dignity.

In the 18th century, poor Swiss German immigrants to the US were described as Krauts because they consumed sauerkraut. Sauerkraut was also a common food served on German ships to fight scurvy, while the British used limes to fight scurvy, and were subsequently termed limey. In Switzerland it was a food preserved for hard winters that could go on for half a year.

The stereotype of a sauerkraut-eating German appears in Jules Verne's depiction of the evil, German industrialist Schultze, who is an avid sauerkraut-eater in The Begum's Fortune. Schultze's enemy is an Alsatian who hates sauerkraut but pretends to love it to win his enemy's confidence.

The rock music genre krautrock has been commonplace in music journalism since the early 1970s and is of English invention.

=== Nazi (pejorative) ===
Nazi, a shortening of Nationalsozialist (National Socialist) (attested since 1903, as a shortening of national-sozial, since in German the nati- in national is approximately pronounced Nazi. A homonymic term Nazi was in use before the rise of the NSDAP in Bavaria as a pet-name for Ignaz and (by extension from that) a derogatory word for a backwards peasant, which may have influenced the use of that abbreviation by the Nazis′ opponents and its avoidance by the Nazis themselves.

=== Ted ===
"Ted", and "Teds", from Tedeschi, the Italian word for Germans, became the term used by Allied soldiers during the Italian campaign of World War II.

=== Teuton (poetic) ===
In a more poetical sense Germans can be referred to as Teutons. The usage of the word in this term has been observed in English since 1833. The word originated via an ancient Germanic tribe, the Teutons (see also Teutonic and the Teutonic Order).

=== Boche (pejorative) ===
Pronounced [boʃ], boche is a derisive term used by the Allies during World War I, often collectively ("the Boche" meaning "the Germans"). It is a shortened form of the French slang portmanteau alboche, itself derived from Allemand ("German") and caboche ("head" or "cabbage"). The alternative spellings "Bosch" or "Bosche" are sometimes found. According to a 1916 article in the New York Times magazine Current History, the origin is as follows:

Boche is an abbreviation of caboche, (compare bochon, an abbreviation of cabochon). This is a recognized French word used familiarly for "head", especially a big, thick head, ("slow-pate"). It is derived from the Latin word caput and the suffix oceus. Boche seems to have been used first in the underworld of Paris about 1860, with the meaning of a disagreeable, troublesome fellow. In the Franco-Prussian war of 1870 it was not applied to the Germans, but soon afterward it was applied by the Parisian printers to their German assistants because of the reputed slowness of comprehension of these foreign printers. The epithet then used was tête de boche, which had the meaning of tête carrée d'Allemand (German blockhead or imbécile). The next step was to apply boche to Germans in general.

=== Squarehead (pejorative) ===
"Squarehead", a generic derogatory term for people from Germany and Scandinavia; Commonly used for Germans during the First and Second World War, but found in a collection of slang from 1906 relating particularly to German military style.

The term Boxhead, commonly used after World War II within the British Armed Forces in the former West Germany is derived from this.

=== Erics ===
First came to prominence in the English 1983 television show Auf Wiedersehen, Pet. It was a term used by the English and Irish when referring to Germans without them knowing it was them being talked about.

== Other countries ==
=== Austria ===
==== Piefke (pejorative) ====
The Austrian ethnic slur for a North German is Piefke. Like its Bavarian counterpart Saupreiß (literally sow-Prussian), the term Piefke historically characterized only the people of Prussia, and not people of other Germanic states. There are two hypotheses on how the term developed; both of them suggest an origin in the 1860s. One theory is that the term came from the name of the popular Prussian composer Johann Gottfried Piefke, who composed some of the most iconic German military marches, for example Preußens Gloria and the Königgrätzer Marsch - particularly since Piefke and his brother conducted the Prussian music corps in the parade in Austria following the Prussian victory of the Austro-Prussian War in 1866. The second theory suggests an origin in the Second Schleswig War in 1864, where Prussians and Austrians were allies. A Prussian soldier with the name Piefke and a stereotypically Prussian gruff and snappy manner made such a negative impression on his Austrian comrades that the term came to refer to all Prussians.

Since Prussia no longer exists, the term refers to the cliché of a pompous northern Protestant German in general and a Berliner in particular. However, the citizens of the free Hanseatic cities and the former northern duchies of Oldenburg, Brunswick and Mecklenburg are also quite offended by the terms Piefke and also by Saupreiß (a slur for any German who is not native Bavarian). In 1990, Austrian playwright Felix Mitterer wrote and co-directed a TV mini-series, Die Piefke-Saga, about Germans on holiday in Tyrol. Sometimes the alteration "Piefkineser" is used. Some Austrians use the playful term "Piefkinesisch" (Pief-Chinese) to refer to German spoken in a distinctly northern German - that is, not Austrian - dialect.

==== Marmeladinger (pejorative) ====
The term Marmeladinger originated in the trenches of World War I. It is derived from the German word "Marmelade", which is a fruit preserve. While Austrian infantry rations included butter and lard as spread, German troops had to make do with cheaper ersatz "Marmelade". They disdainfully called it Heldenbutter "hero's butter" or Hindenburgfett. This earned them ridicule from their Austrian allies who would call them Marmeladebrüder (jam brothers) or Marmeladinger (-inger being an Austrian derivational suffix describing a person through a characteristic item or action). Germans would conversely call Austrians Kamerad Schnürschuh "comrade lace-up shoe" because the Austrian infantry boots used laces while the German boots did not. This term has survived, but it is rarely used.

=== China ===
==== Jiamen (colloquial) ====
In Shanghainese, a German can be colloquially called a Jiamen (茄門/茄门), which is an adaptation of the English word "German".

This word carries a somewhat negative meaning of a stereotypical German being proud, withdrawn, cold, and serious. This phrase, when pronounced as "Ga-Men", can mean "disdainful, indifferent, or uninterested in someone or something".

=== Chile ===
Among the Mapuche-Huilliche of Futahuillimapu in southern Chile, German settlers are known as leupe lonko or blond heads.

=== Finland ===
During the Lapland War between Finland and Germany, the terms saku, sakemanni, hunni, and lapinpolttaja (Lapland arsonist, see: Lapland War) became widely used among the Finnish soldiers; saku and sakemanni being modified from saksalainen (German).

=== France ===
==== Boches (pejorative, historical) ====
Boches is an apheresis of the word alboche, which in turn is a blend of allemand (French for German) and caboche (slang for head). It was used mainly during the First and Second World Wars, and directed especially at German soldiers.

==== Casque à pointe (historical) ====
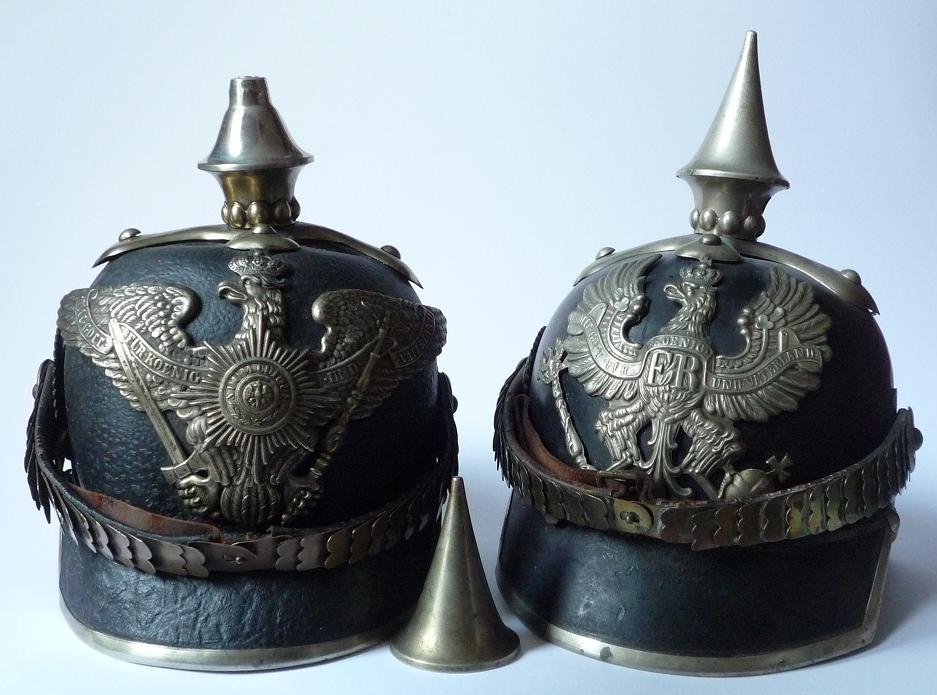
Two leather Pickelhauben, or "casques à pointe" from the Franco-Prussian War era

Casque à pointe is derived from the French name for the traditional Prussian military helmets worn by German soldiers from the 1840s until World War I. In modern French Sign Language the word for Germany continues to be an index finger pointed to the top of the forehead, simulating the Pickelhaube.

==== Chleuh (pejorative) ====
Chleuh derives from the name of the Chleuh, a Berber ethnic group in Morocco. It also denotes the absence of words beginning in Schl- in French.

=== Germany ===
==== Ossi/Wessi ====
The term Ossi, derived from the German word Osten which means east, is used in Germany for people who were born in the area of the former German Democratic Republic.

The term Wessi, derived from the German word Westen which means west, is used in Germany for people who were born or live in the old states of Germany (those that formed the Federal Republic or "West Germany" before reunification). Sometimes it is also modified to "Besserwessi", from the German word Besserwisser which means Know-it-all, reflecting the stereotype that people from the Western part of Germany are arrogant.

In 2010 there was a lawsuit in Germany because a job applicant was denied employment and her application was found to have the notation "Ossi" and a minus sign written on her application documents. A German court decided that denial of employment for such a reason would be discrimination, but not ethnic discrimination, since "East German" is not an ethnicity.

==== Kartoffel/Alman/Biodeutscher ====
The term Kartoffel (German for potato) is a derogatory slang term for ethnic Germans. In the 19th century it was used to describe areas of Germany in a need of eating potatoes like "potatosaxons". Gastarbeiter used the term "potatoeater" for Germans, while "spaghettieater" meant migrant Italians and "kebabeaters" Turks. Today the term is often also used ironically by members of the described group for themselves. Alman and Biodeutscher ("biological German") are similar terms coming out of the migrant community. Biodeutsch has also been adopted by some in the New Right in Germany to refer to a supposed 'genetic origin' of 'true' Germans.

==== Saupreiß ====
The term Saupreiß, derived from the German words Sau (= 'sow') which means female pig and Preuße which means Prussian, is used in Bavaria for people who were born or live in any German area north of the Danube river, or at least north of the Bavarian border. A number of other terms exist. Similar to the Polish Szwab, the term Schwab can be pejorative and be used to express Schwabenhass. Various – more or less good-humoured – nicknames are being used between the different German states or areas, such as Gelbfüßler ("Yellowfeeter") for the inhabitants of Baden.

=== Hungary ===
==== Sváb ====
The term sváb derives from the German word "Schwaben", describing people from Swabia (ger: Schwaben). The first German-speaking people, Saxon merchants and miners, later becoming Carpathian Germans, first arrived to the Carpathian basin (then mostly under rule of the Kingdom of Hungary) in the 12th century, their numbers and territory of settlement were limited, mainly in towns. In the 18th century various German-speaking peasant groups settled in Hungary in large numbers to inhabit the vast territories being depopulated during the Osman rule, they are known as Danube Swabians (Donauschwaben), though most of their forefathers have Bavarian or Thuringian roots. They settled mainly where the destruction was most severe, especially around Buda (part of modern Budapest), Danube valley and southern part of Hungary. Although they have assimilated in large part, until the beginning of the 20th century they maintained strong cultural identity. These people, and through them German people in general are called svábok (plural), having a hint of pejorative nature.

==== Labanc ====
The term labanc came into use during Rákóczi's War of Independence. It was specifically used for the soldiers fighting for the Austrian/German soldiers of the Habsburg rulers, as well as for the Hungarians siding with the Habsburgs. There are multiple theories about where it came from, such as being a strange concatenation of the German term "Lauf Hans!" (Run Hans!) or the French term Le Blanc (the white one), it might also be a reference to the Hungarian word lobonc which referred to the large, common wig, which used to be common in the Vienna court at the time. Now Labanc is exclusively used for Austrians, but has become rare in usage as there are no tensions between the two countries. The expression describes a mentality or behaviour that is counter to general Hungarian interest and describes persons not content with "true" Hungarian values.

=== Israel ===
==== Yekke ====
For the Jews who came from the German speaking world, there was a word in use for many years: "Yekke", in Yiddish and Hebrew. One of the explanations of the name in Hebrew is "Yehudi Kshe Havana" יהודי קשה הבנה "A Jew who hardly understands" for the so called "stiffness of their mentality".

=== Italy ===
==== Crucco (pejorative) ====
The term crucco derived from the Croatian and Slovenian kruh ("bread"). Italian soldiers invented this word during World War I when they captured some hungry Austrian-Croatian and Austrian-Slovenian soldiers who asked for "kruh". Later, during World War II, and still today, applied to all German-speaking people.

==== Tuder / Tudro (pejorative) ====
Tudro designates Germans as a people lacking flexibility and fantasy, but also emotional intelligence. It is more widely adopted to describe a sturdy and stupid man. Tudro is mainly used in Northern Italy. Tuder is the Lombard usage of the word.

Fascia rossa (pejorative)

The term Fascia Rossa is an Italian designation referring to German soldiers and specifically denotes their red armband adorned with a swastika, this term is mainly used in Southern Italy.

=== Latvia ===
==== Fricis ====
Fricis derives from the German name Fritz.

==== Zili pelēkie ====
Zili pelēkie, literally translated, means "The Blue-Grays", from the Prussian war uniforms of the pre-World War I era. The term appeared in a popular Latvian legionnaire wartime song Ik katru sestdien's vakaru ("Every saturday night") about trouncing the blue-grays after beating up reds (sarkanos) or lice-infested ones (utainos) – the Soviets.

=== Netherlands and Belgium ===
==== Mof (pejorative) ====
In Dutch the most common term for the German people, after the regular/official "Duitse", is mof. It is regarded as a pejorative term, used exclusively for Germans and reflecting Dutch resentment of the German occupation of the Netherlands during the Second World War and the respective German actions.

In the late 16th century the area just beyond the current northeast border between the Netherlands and Germany now known as East Frisia and Emsland, as well as the people that lived there, used to be referred to as Muffe. Some time later it evolved into an informal designation, still not a pejorative, of someone from Germany in general; however the term seemed to have died out around 1900. Then it was revived to a far greater use and with negative connotations ever since Germany invaded the Netherlands in 1940.

A humorous (but false) etymology of the word mof by the Dutch is that it is a German abbreviation meaning Menschen ohne Freunde ("people without friends").

Germany was known as Mofrika, an amalgamation of mof and Afrika, during WW2.

==== Pruus(j) ====
Pruus or Pruusj, is a friendly but somewhat mocking term, used in the south eastern part of The Netherlands as part of the 'Limburg dialect'.

==== Poep ====
Poep is a term used in the northern eastern part of The Netherlands, in the province of Drenthe, referring to a German from nearby Westphalia. It is said that the etymological reference points to the German word Bube (=boy) yet this is unconfirmed.

- A blaaspoep is a German playing a brass instrument
- blaaspoepenmuziek is German brass band music
- Poepenland refers to Germany

=== Poland ===
==== Fryc (pejorative) ====
Means novice, and comes from the German name Fritz, which is a diminutive of Friedrich. German trade and settlements acquainted Poles with this name. A German coming to Poland was actually a novice hence was called Fryc.

==== Pluder (pejorative) ====
A pejorative and historical term that came from Hose (clothing) being the part of wardrobe.

==== Prusak (pejorative) ====
A Polish term for an inhabitant of Prussia and for the species of bugs called German cockroach, and it is also a contemptuous term for a German.

==== Szkop (pejorative) ====
Contemptuous term for a German soldier of the Wehrmacht during World War II as the word szkop in Polish meant a wether, or castrated ram.

==== Szwab (pejorative) ====
Derives from Suebi, a historical Germanic tribe. Used extensively during and after World War II.

=== Russia ===
Kolbasnik, колбасник – an outdated (used mostly before 1940s) pejorative term, which verbally meant "a sausage-maker".

=== Spain ===
==== Tudesco (historical) ====
In Early Modern Spanish (for example in Don Quixote), tudesco (cognate with deutsch and the Italian tedesco) was used sometimes as a general name for Germans and sometimes restricted to Lower Saxony.

=== Switzerland ===
==== Gummihals (pejorative) ====
German for rubber-neck. The term has been verified to be in use at least since the 1970s, with its meaning subject to debate. Theories include the stereotype of Germans talking too much or nodding their heads endlessly when listening to superiors.

==== Schwab (pejorative) ====
The ordinary (non-pejorative) meaning is people from Swabia (roughly Baden-Württemberg) in South Germany, neighbouring Switzerland, but in Switzerland it is used for any German. A strengthening is Sauschwabe.

=== Turkey ===
Hans and Helga, the German names. Almancı or Alamancı, often used pejoratively, refers to Germans of Turkish origin.

== See also ==
- Anti-German sentiment
- Barbarian
- List of ethnic slurs by ethnicity
- Names of Germany
