= Piefke =

Piefke stands for

- a derogatory term used for Germans in Austria, but also used in Berlinese dialect where it is pronounced pifke.
- Johann Gottfried Piefke, a German conductor
