= Königgrätzer Marsch =

German military march

- March by Johann Gottfried Piefke
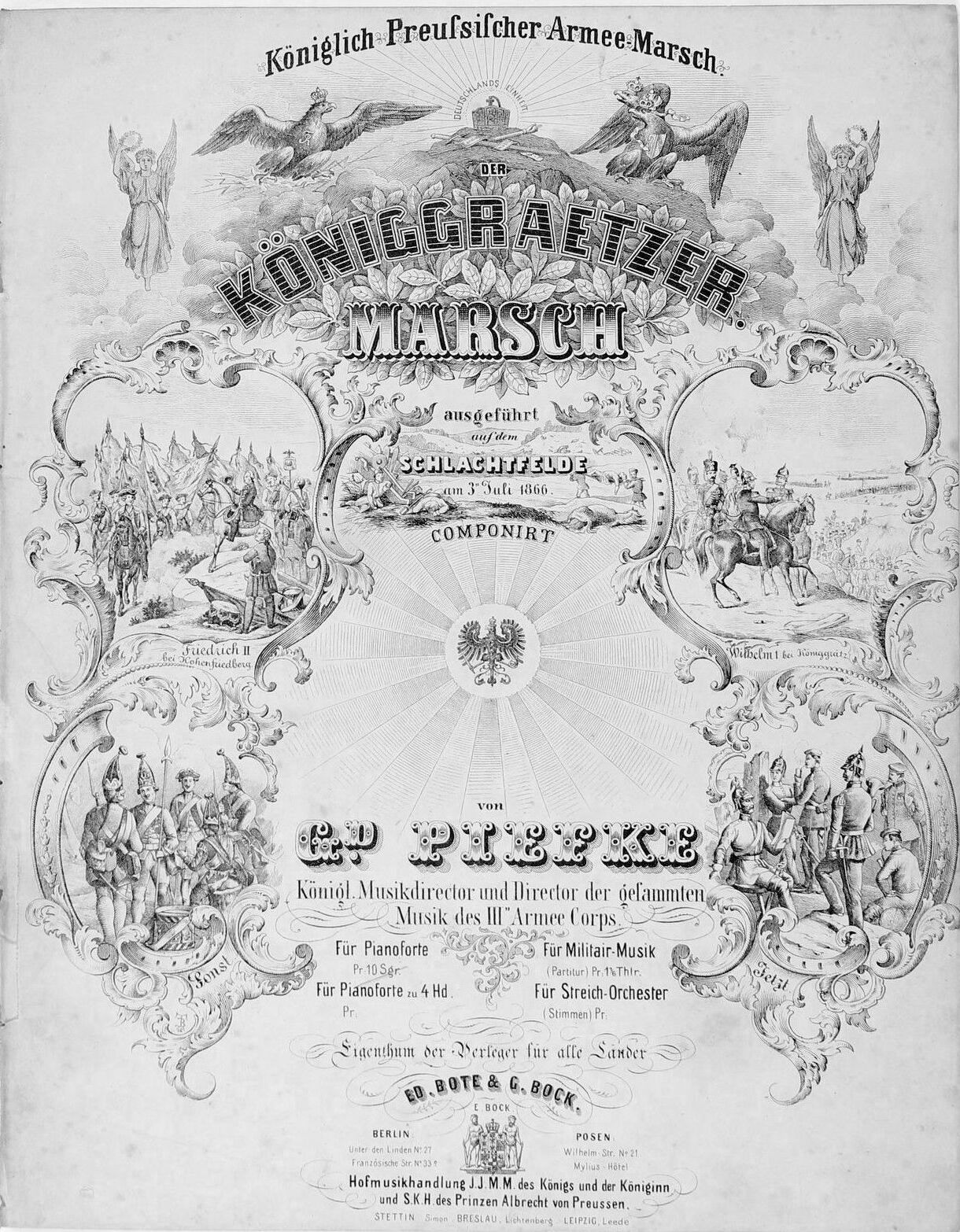
- Catalogue: AM II, 134 (AM II, 195)
- Occasion: Commemoration of Battle of Königgrätz (1866)
- Composed: 1866

The Königgrätzer Marsch (AM II, 134 [AM II, 195]), also known as Der Königgrätzer and the Königgrätz March, is one of the most famous German military marches, composed in 1866 by the German band leader Johann Gottfried Piefke in commemoration of the Battle of Königgrätz, the decisive battle of the Austro-Prussian War, in which the Kingdom of Prussia defeated the Austrian Empire. In Piefke's most successful arrangement of the Königgrätzer Marsch, another march, Der Hohenfriedberger (commemorating the Battle of Hohenfriedberg), is used as a trio. The commonly played version (AM II, 195) is set as an infantry march, while an alternate adaptation is arranged as a cavalry galop (AM III, 228). The German military march catalogue also has the "Königgrätzer mit anderem Trio" ("Königgrätzer with Other Trio"; Heeresmarsch IIIB, 67), but this secondary composition is far less recognized.

== History ==
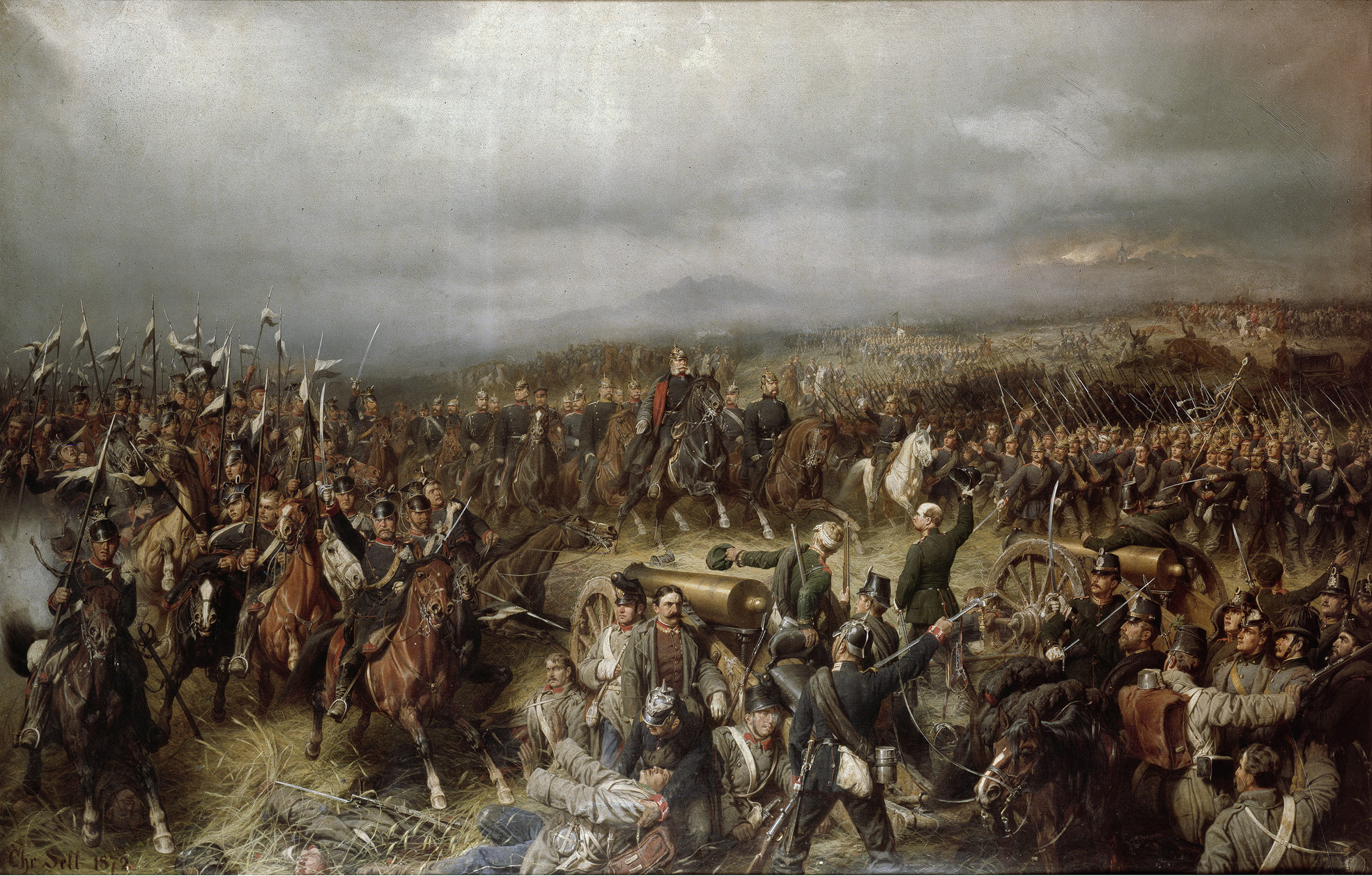
The Battle of Königgrätz, deciding battle of the Austro-Prussian War.

The first draft of the march is said to have been written by Piefke on the battlefield itself. The confident six-eighths meter composition follows the battle in two parts, the beginning motif signifying the indecisive combat between the first Prussian contingent and the Austrians, the second motif signifying the arrival of Prussian reinforcements. Piefke used Der Hohenfriedberger as a trio to recall the older victories of king Frederick the Great over the Austrians in the 18th century. The victory in the Battle of Königgrätz paved the way for the supremacy of Prussia in the German Confederation and ultimately led to the establishment of the German Empire in 1871.

The Königgrätzer Marsch continues to be extremely popular and is a staple of any modern German military parade, whereas in Austria it is heard only very rarely, because the piece is associated with Austrian military failure. Like many other German marches and musical compositions (such as Der Hohenfriedberger and the Badonviller Marsch), the Nazis made significant use of the Königgrätzer Marsch. The piece has the dubious distinction of being one of Adolf Hitler's reported favorite marches, and it was often played during his public appearances including the Nuremberg Rally. This connotation, however, has not dimmed the march's image, and it has been recorded many times by bands and orchestras since the Second World War.

Like many German marches it is also used by the Chilean Army and other militaries with a historical connection to Germany. The "Königgrätzer" is the regimental march of the 2nd Battalion, The Jamaica Regiment, under the name "2nd Battalion West India Regiment", and the gallop march (under the name "Granaderos al Galope", with the addition of a traditional French fanfare) of the 1st Cavalry Regiment "Granaderos" of Chile. It was the march of the 91st Oldenburg Infantry Regiment and the parade-march of the 1st Bavarian Infantry Regiment "König" of the Imperial German Army.

== In popular culture ==
- The "Königgrätzer Marsch" was adopted and has been interpreted by the Chilean Army's cavalry and mounted units, and by the Santiago garrison war and instrumental bands since the early XX century. It is most notably performed by the galloping, mounted Presidential Escort Cavalry Regiment No. 1 Granaderos' war and instrumental bands during the Army's yearly 'Grand Parade'.
- The "Königgrätzer Marsch" is heard at the beginning of the massive revue parade in Leni Riefenstahl's Nuremberg Rally propaganda film, Triumph of the Will (1935) when Viktor Lutze leads SA honor guards in their march past.
- In the French war comedy Ace of Aces (1982), the Königgrätzer Marsch plays at a Berlin railway station during the 1936 Summer Olympics, where a band is playing.
- In modded versions of the 2003 video game Day of Defeat, the "Königgrätzer Marsch" played if the Wehrmacht faction won.
- In Call of Duty: World at War's multiplayer mode, if the Wehrmacht faction wins, the "Königgrätzer Marsch" plays. Also, in the final mission of the game's campaign mode, the song can be heard within and outside of the Reichstag while fighting an SS unit. It can also be heard in the minigame Nazi zombies on the map Nacht der Untoten.
- The march was featured in the film Indiana Jones and the Last Crusade (1989) when Jones infiltrates a Nazi book-burning ceremony. This was meant to be a reference to Triumph of the Will; scenes with Leni Riefenstahl herself (played by Suzanne Roquette) filming the rally were shot but deleted from the final cut.

== See also ==
- Preußens Gloria (also by Piefke)
