= Armeemarschsammlung =

Catalog of German military march music

The Armeemarschsammlung (Army March Collection), also known as the Prussian Army March Collection (Preußische Armeemarschsammlung), is the basic catalog of works of German military march music.

== Origins ==
The basis for the creation of an extensive set of scores for military brass bands lies in a highest cabinet order (Allerhöchste Kabinettsorder) of King Friedrich Wilhelm III of Prussia on 10 February 1817 requesting a selection of proven compositions for every regiment of infantry, cavalry and artillery:

In order to assist the regiments of the army in the selection of good military music, I have had a number of well-proved pieces prepared, and a set of them is to be supplied to each regiment. As, in this way, the army will come into the possession of good music, I decree that on all ceremonial occasions, at grand parades, and reviews, and particularly those at which I am present, no other marches will be played.

Friedrich Wilhelm III's initial collection consisted of 36 slow marches and 36 quick marches for infantry.

This Army March Collection in time contained Prussian, Austrian and Russian marches, divided into three collections:

- Collection I: Slow marches for infantry (115 marches)
- Collection II: Parade (quick) marches for infantry (269 marches)
- Collection III: Cavalry Marches (149 marches)

Marches in the third (cavalry) collection were first published by Schlesinger in Berlin beginning in 1824 and continued by Bote & Bock in Berlin and finally Breitkopf & Härtel in Leipzig (a project terminated at the end of World War I). This was titled Collection of Marches and Fanfares for Trumpet-Music for the Use of the Prussian Cavalry (Sammlung von Marschen und Fanfaren für Trumpetenmusik zum Gebrauch der preußischen Kavallerie).

All the marches incorporated into the army march collection have an official number including a Roman numeral designation (denoting collection) and an Arabic number (list number in the collection). Some well known examples:

- "Preußischer Präsentiermarsch" (AM I, 1a und III, 1a)
- "Fridericus-Rex-Grenadiermarsch" (AM II, 198)
- "Des Großen Kurfürsten Reitermarsch" (AM III, 72)
- "Hohenfriedberger Marsch" (AM III, 1b)
- "Königgrätzer Marsch" (AM II, 195)
- "Kreutzritter-Fanfare" ("The Crusaders Fanfare") (AM III, 113)
- "Pappenheimer" (AM I, 100)
- "Marsch der Finnländischen Reiterei" ("Finnish Cavalry March") (AM III, 70)
- "Pariser Einzugsmarsch" (AM II, 38)
- "Petersburger Marsch" (AM II, 113)
- "Preußens Gloria" ("Prussia's Glory") (AM II, 240)
- "Torgauer Marsch" (AM II, 210)
- "Yorckscher Marsch" (AM II, 103)

== Austro-Hungarian list ==
A comprehensive and systematic collection of marches was also created for the Kaiserlich und Königliche Armee (Imperial and Royal Austrian Army).

On March 24, 1894, the Imperial and Royal War Ministry issued an order (Kriegsministerium no. 1157) to create the publication of a standardized list of marches. This order includes: "The Imperial War Ministry intends to revive and preserve the tradition of outstanding epochs in the history of our nation and army by compiling and publishing in uniform orchestrations the older historic marches which owe their fame to successes in war, as well as suitable marches that were dedicated to the memory of glorious regiments, famous generals, or regimental colonels-in-chief".

The official codification, the Historische Märsche und sonstige Compositionen für das kaiserliche und königliche Heer (Historical Marches and Other Compositions for the Imperial and Royal Army) was ready in time for Franz Joseph I of Austria’s fiftieth jubilee year of 1898. Included were 49 marches and military tunes, including 36 officially recognized regimental marches arranged numerically by regiment: from the 1er Regimentsmarsch "Trautenauer Gefechtsmarsch" by Ferdinand Preis to the 79er Regimentsmarsch "Jellačić-Marsch" (Anon).

The official branch marches of the artillery ("Artillerie-Marsch" composer unknown) and navy ("Tegetthoff-Marsch" by Anton Rosenkranz) plus one of the military academy marches ("Jung Österreich Marsch" by Andreas Leonhardt) were also included in the publication.

By February 1914 there were assigned marches for the four Tiroler Kaiserjägerregiments as well as 102 Infantry Regiments.

== New collection ==
A new Army March Collection was decreed by the Reichswehr-Ministerium on May 15, 1925, under the supervision of military musician Hermann Schmidt (who would serve as Heeresmusikinspizient - Chief of Music for the Armed Forces 1929–1945). Old and newly composed marches were incorporated. Marches of the former Royal Prussian, Royal Bavarian, Royal Saxon, and Royal Württemberg Armies were now merged into one collection, alongside those of the lower ranking states of the former Empire. Preparation of this collection ended in 1945. It was now divided into four subgroups:

- Collection I: Presentation Marches (Präsentiermärsche) for infantry (8 marches)
- Collection II: Parade marches for infantry (38 marches)
- Collection III: Cavalry marches in step (slow pace) (17 marches)
- Collection IIIB: Cavalry marches in canter (fast pace) (83 marches)

The collection continued to grow and be divided into new distinct groups:

- Collection I: Slow Marches for the infantry
- Collection II: Quick Marches for the infantry
- Collection III: Marches for Mounted Troops (cavalry) and field artillery
- Collection IV: Miscellaneous Marches

Group IV was added in 1929 and included two subdivisions:

- Collection IVa: Marches of Armeemarsch quality and character of importance to particular regiments of the individual German states
- Collection IVb: Marches for fifes and drums of the Royal Prussian Army regiments of 1806

== Heeresmarschsammlung ==
In 1933 Hermann Schmidt revised and renamed the collection to the Heeresmarschsammlung. Marches infrequently performed were eliminated and marches of Saxony were added. Trots and gallops were added which caused Collection III to be divided into IIIa slow marches and IIIb trots and gallops. The Heeresmarschsammlung was denoted as HM (and also VDHM, for Verzeichnis Deutscher Heeresmärsche).

Some marches are noted as in both the AM and HM collections:

- "Preußens Gloria" (AM II, 240 and HM II, 98)
- "Yorckscher Marsch" (AM II, 103, and HM II, 5)

Two famous marches newly added in the revised numbering scheme:

- "Alte Kameraden" (HM II, 150)
- "Badenweiler Marsch" (HM II, 256)

Few of the most famed German march composers were incorporated in the Armeemarschsammlung or Heeresmarsch collections. Prolific and famed march composers Hermann Louis Blankenburg, Franz von Blon, Richard Eilenberg, Carl Friedemann, Ernst Stieberitz, and Carl Teike are not included in the Armeemarschsammlung. Of these famous march composers, in the Heeresmarsch collection only Blon ("Unter dem Siegesbanner", HM II, 152) and "Victoria" (HM II, 153); Friedemann ("Kaiser Friederich", HM II, 151); and Teike ("Alte Kameraden", HM II, 150) are included. Reasons for their lack of inclusion are several: These composers not being in military service in their most productive years, their marches considered more suitable to concert rather than parade use, and finally their marches considered more technically difficult than those adopted for either the AM or HM collections.

In the early 1960s, Wilhelm Stephan (1908-1994), a military musician in the Bundeswehr, was charged with yet another revision of the Heeresmarschsammlung. Stephan selected the most famous works from the historic collection and assigned a new numbering system, returning to the older AM nomenclature:

- Collection I: Parade Marches for Infantry (Präsentiermärsche für Fußtruppen) (19 Marches)
- Collection I: Slow Marches for Infantry (Langsame Märsche) (11 marches)
- Collection I: Parade Marches for Mounted Troops (Präsentiermärsche und Parademärsche im Schritt für berittene Truppen) (17 marches)
- Collection I: Tattoos (Zapfenstreiche) (4)
- Collection I: Appendix (2 marches)
- Collection II: Parade Marches for Infantry (64 marches)
- Collection III: Parade Marches at the Trot and Canter (Parademärsche im Trabe und im Galopp) (35 marches)

The marches in Collection I are numbered 1-53, in Collection II 101-164, and in Collection III 201-235, for a total of 152 marches.

The German Wikipedia article on the Armeemarschsammlung includes a comprehensive list based on Stephan’s work de:Armeemarschsammlung.

== World War II-era marches ==
The only Luftwaffe march incorporated into the collection was Gustav Rath's "Flieger-Parade" HM II, 143 (added in 1933). Rath's march had won a competition in 1932 for army marches. Luftwaffenmusikinspizient (Chief of Music for the Air Force 13 August 1936 – 1945) Hans Felix Husadel chose "Flieger-Parade" as Geschwindmärsche no. 47 for a collection of marches suitable for the new air force. At the same time, Carl Clewing and Husadel created a Liederbuch der Luftwaffe containing approved national hymns and song adapted to marches plus a new set of marches for military bands.

Marches for the Reichsmarine and its later equivalent Kriegsmarine included HM I, 60 "Holländischer Ehrenmarsch" (i.e. "Präsentiermarsch der Marine") of Jacob Rauscher; HM I, 61 "Marsch der I. Matrosendivision" of Prinz Heinrich von Preußen; HM II, 145 "Unsere Marine" of Richard Thiele; and HM II, 156 "Panzerschiff Deutschland" of Erich Schumann. HM II, 130, the classic "Gruß an Kiel" composed in 1864 by Friedrich Spohr, was also considered a navy march by the time it was adopted into the Heeresmarsch. Given the expansion of the fleet begun in 1890 under Kaiser Wilhelm II, "Gruß an Kiel" was often used as a greeting to ships entering and exiting the port of Kiel. All of these marches were adopted into the Heeresmarsch in 1933 except "Panzerschiff Deutschland" which was adopted in 1939. A collection of songs for sailors Blaujacken-Lieder (Blue Jacket Songs) was compiled by Gerhard Pallmann for the Kriegsmarine.

== Post-World War II status ==
Many works from the older AM collection are missing original editions or are fragmentary. Some of the composers of the marches are unknown. The destruction of the Prussian State Archives in Potsdam in 1945 is partly to blame. The military music sections of the Bundeswehr and private organizations are attempting to resolve this situation and keep this collection of marches from disappearing.

== Discography ==
Several recordings have been made of marches from the Armeemarschsammlung with particulars about the collections. These include:

- Deutsche Armeemärsche. Stabsmusikkorps der Bundeswehr conducted by Wilhelm Stephan. A collection of 79 marches conducted by the military musician charged with reorganization of the Heeresmarschsammlung. 5 LPs on Philips.
- Deutsche Armeemärsche und Der grosse Zapfenstreich. Ludwigsburg Bauer-Studios BCD 7278 (5CDs) Heeresmusikkorps 5, Koblenz conducted by Johannes Schade or Heinrich Schlüter. A collection of 124 marches which derive from the long playing record era including marches from Prussia, Hanover, Hesse, Bavaria, and Saxony.
- Deutsche Heeresmärsche aus Bayerischen Armeemarschsammlungen. Telefunken 6.23342 (LP) Heeresmusikkorps 5 der Bundeswehr Conductors: Johannes Schade and Heinrich Schlüter.
- Deutsche Heeresmarsche aus der Preussischen Armeemarschsammlung. Telefunken 6.23341 Heeresmusikkorps 5 der Bundeswehr Conductors: Johannes Schade and Heinrich Schlüter.
- Deutsche Heeresmärche aus der Preussischen Armeemarschsammlung. Telefunken 6.30111 (3LPs) Heeresmusikkorps 5 der Bundeswehr Conductors: Johannes Schade and Heinrich Schlüter.
- Deutsche Heeresmärsche: Fanfarenmarsch der Cavallerie. Telefunken King K20C-345 (LP). Trompeterskorps der Ehemaligen Berittenen Truppen, Bückeburger Jäger, Luftwaffen-Musikkorps 1, Heeresmusikkorps 5 ; Conductors: Johannes Schade, Wilfried Majewski, Helmut Schaal, and Heinrich Schlüter.
- Historische Armee-Märsche (nach Original-Partituren aus d. preuß. Armeemarsch-Sammlung) 605 Märsche der Preußischen Armeemarschsammlung und der Deutschen Heeresmarschsammlung / Die Deutsche Gesellschaft für Militärmusik. 52 LPs and text supplements with Stadmusik (Wien) conducted by Gustav Fischer and Militärmusik Burgenland conducted by Rudolf Schrumpf.
- Königlich Preussische Armeemärsche: In Zeitgenössischer Besetzung nach den Originalpartituren von Wieprecht. Telefunken 6.40231 (LP) Heeresmusikkorps 5 der Bundeswehr Conductors: Johannes Schade and Heinrich Schlüter.
- Marsche – Prussian and Austrian Marches. Deutsche Grammophon 2721 077 (2 LPs) Blasorchester der Berliner Philharmoniker. Conductor: Herbert von Karajan.
- Truppenmärsche der Deutschen Bundeswehr. Teldec-Telefunken TS 3276 (2 LPs) Das Heeresmusikkorps 1; Das Heeresmusikkorps 3; Das Heeresmusikkorps 6. Conductors: Werner Gummelt, Hans Herzberg, and Johannes Schade.
- Wohlauf, Kameraden! German cavalry marches and songs, 1928-1941 (CD) Brandenburg Historica BH0934
- Grossdeutschland: Von der Wachtruppe zum Panzerkorps 1928-1943 (CD) Brandenburg Historica BH0914
- Hoch Deutschlands Flotte! Music of the Imperial German Navy 1907-1917 (CD) Brandenburg Historica BH0918
- Gott, Kaiser, Vaterland. Military and Patriotic Music of Imperial Germany, 1903-1917 (CD) Brandenburg Historica BH0901
