= Der Hohenfriedberger =

German military march

- March by possibly Frederick the Great
- Catalogue: AM I, 21
- Occasion: Commemoration of Battle of Hohenfriedberg (1745)
- Text: Written for 100th anniversary of the battle (1845)
- Published: 1795 (piano rendition)

"Der Hohenfriedberger" (AM I, 21 (Army March I, 1c and Army March III, 1b) (also "(Der) Hohenfriedberger Marsch"), is a well known German military march. It takes its name from the victory of the Prussians over the allied armies of the Archduchy of Austria and the Electorate of Saxony on 4 June 1745 during the Second Silesian War at the Battle of Hohenfriedberg, near Striegau (current day Strzegom in Poland).

== History ==
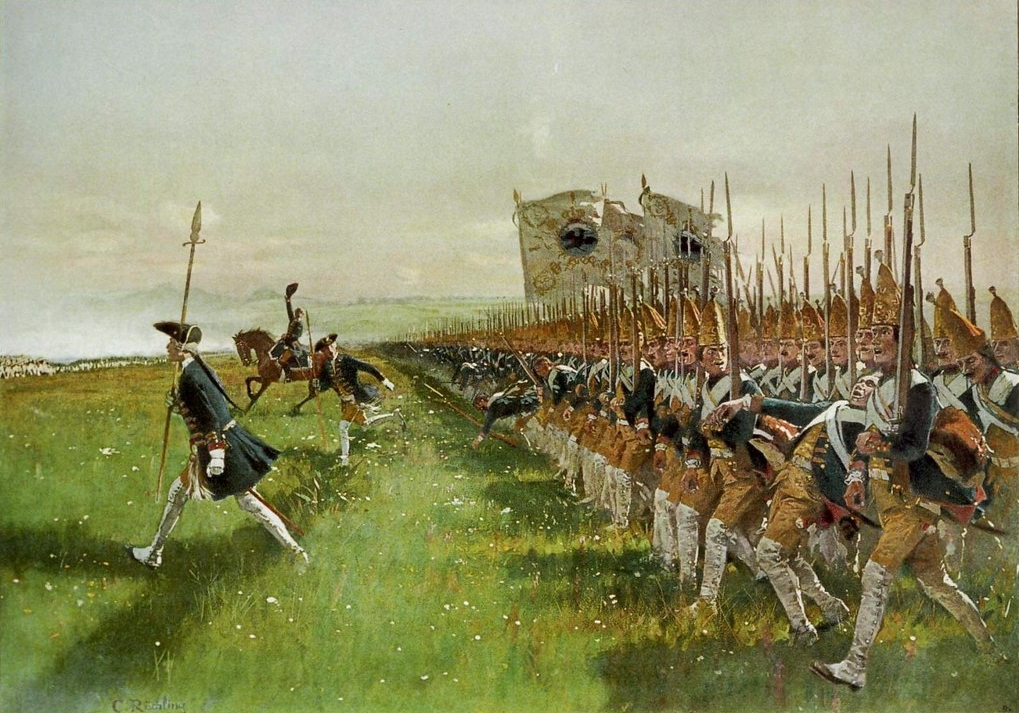
Battle of Hohenfriedberg

There are many legends surrounding the origins of the march. Supposedly, the Bayreuth dragoon regiment, which was crucial in securing a Prussian victory, reported to its quarters the day after the battle while the march was played. Whether the march was actually played then is just as questionable as the claim that Frederick the Great was the composer of the piece. It is understood that the king issued to the Bayreuther dragoon regiment a Gnadenbrief (letter of grace) that authorized it to play both grenadier marches of the foot soldiers (with flutes and drums) and the cuirassier marches of the cavalry (with kettledrums and trumpet fanfare).

The lyrics were certainly composed later; at the time of the victory of Hohenfriedberg, these Dragoons did not yet bear the title "Ansbach-Bayreuth".

The first outline (piano rendition) was written in 1795. For the first time in 1845, in celebration of the hundredth anniversary of the battle, the march was given lyrics, "Auf, Ansbach-Dragoner! Auf, Ansbach-Bayreuth!" because the regiment by then had been renamed "Ansbach-Bayreuth". In the time of the German Empire the title "Hohenfriedberger" was symbolic because of its connection with the great military victories of Frederick and the House of Hohenzollern.

In commemoration of the victories of Frederick against the Austrians, Johann Gottfried Piefke added "Der Hohenfriedberger" as a trio to his "Königgrätzer Marsch" written after the victorious Battle of Königgrätz in 1866.

The march was formerly in use by the Life Guards Horse Artillery of the Russian Imperial Guard, under the name of "The Double Headed Eagle Soars High".

== Music ==
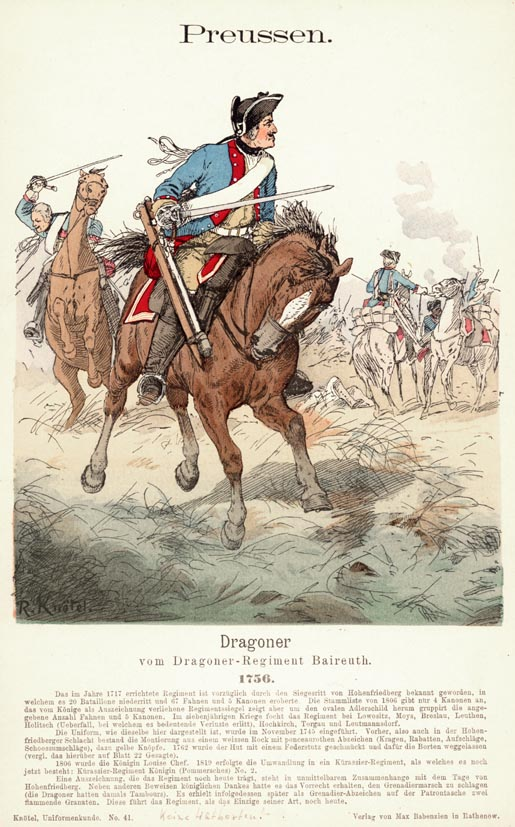
Dragoons of Dragoner-Regiment Nr. 5 (Ansbach-Dragoner) depicted by Richard Knötel

== 1845 lyrics ==
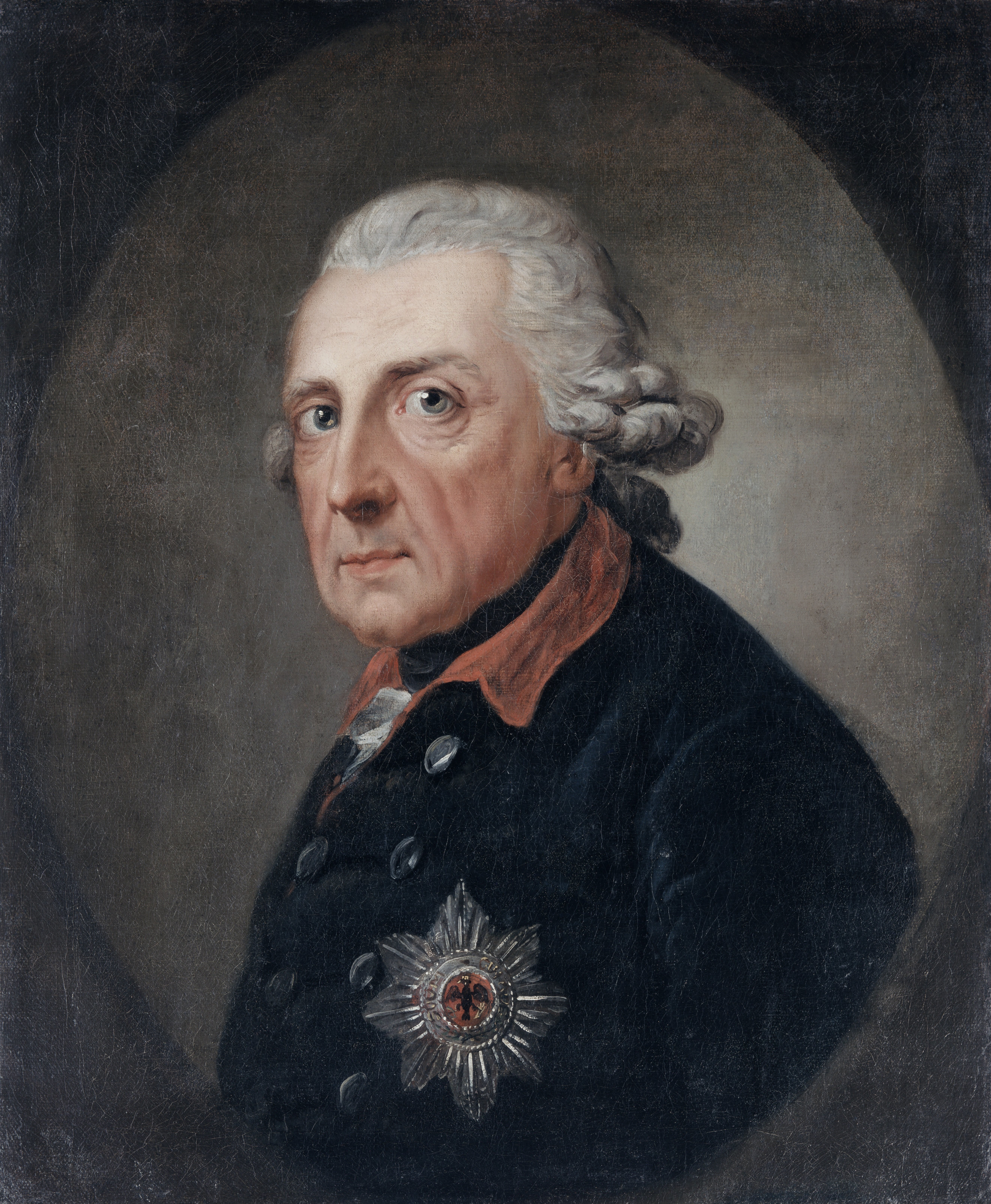
Frederick the Great

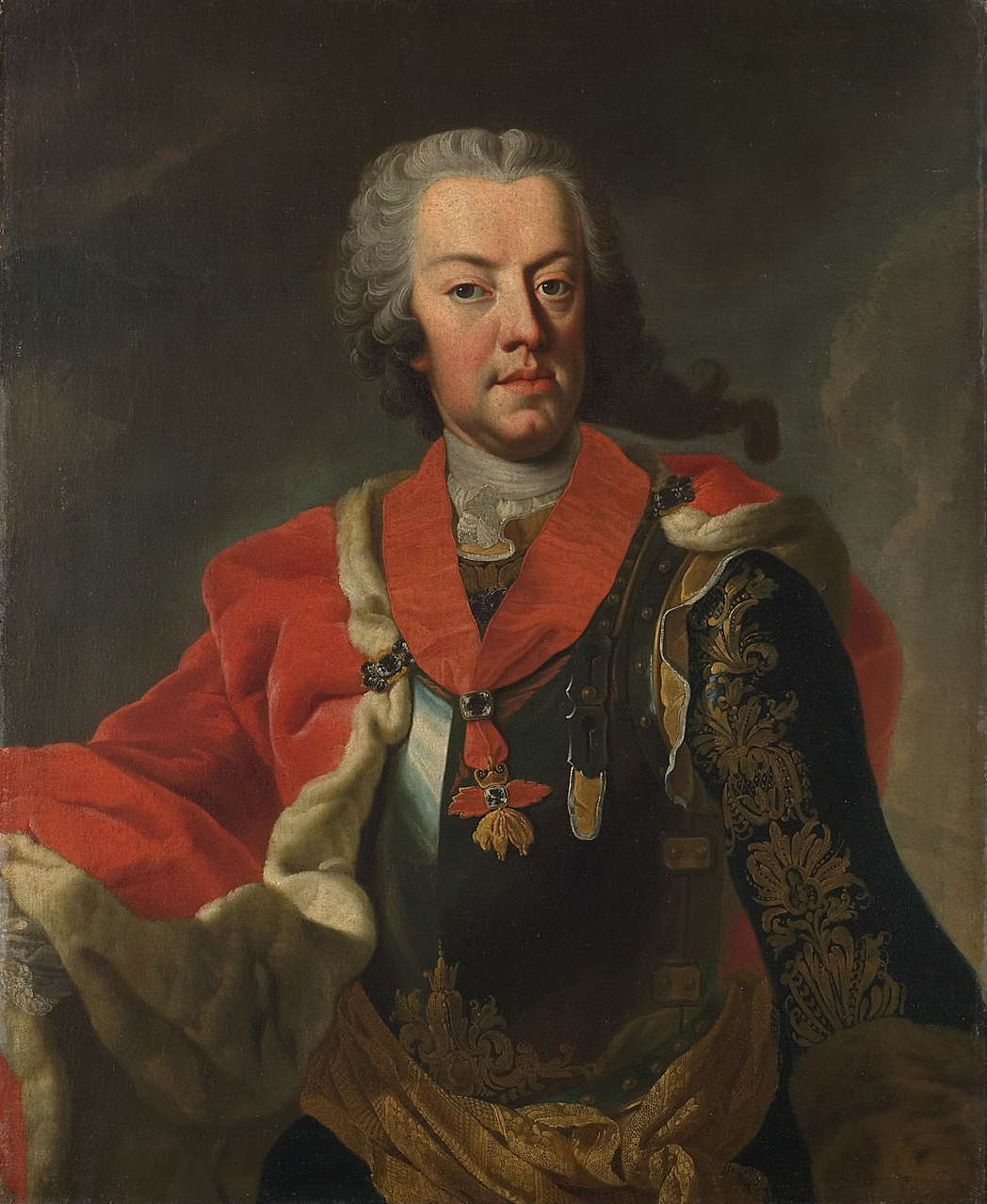
Prince Charles Alexander of Lorraine, the Austrian commander

Auf, Ansbach-Dragoner!
Auf, Ansbach-Bayreuth!
Schnall um deinen Säbel
und rüste dich zum Streit!
Prinz Karl ist erschienen
auf Friedbergs Höh'n,
Sich das preußische Heer
mal anzusehen.
Refrain:
𝄆 Drum, Kinder, seid lustig
und allesamt bereit:
Auf, Ansbach-Dragoner!
Auf, Ansbach-Bayreuth! 𝄇

Hab'n Sie keine Angst,
Herr Oberst von Schwerin,
Ein preuß'scher Dragoner
tut niemals nicht flieh'n!
Und stünd'n sie auch noch
so dicht auf Friedbergs Höh'n,
Wir reiten sie zusammen
wie Frühlingsschnee.
Refrain:
Ob Säbel, ob Kanon',
ob Kleingewehr uns dräut:
Auf, Ansbach-Dragoner!
Auf, Ansbach-Bayreuth!
Drum, Kinder, seid lustig
und allesamt bereit:
Auf, Ansbach-Dragoner!
Auf, Ansbach-Bayreuth!

Halt, Ansbach-Dragoner!
Halt, Ansbach-Bayreuth!
Wisch ab deinen Säbel
und laß vom Streit;
Denn ringsumher
auf Friedbergs Höh'n
Ist weit und breit
kein Feind mehr zu seh'n.
Refrain:
Und ruft unser König,
zur Stelle sind wir heut':
Auf, Ansbach-Dragoner!
Auf, Ansbach-Bayreuth!
Drum, Kinder, seid lustig
und allesamt bereit:
Auf, Ansbach-Dragoner!
Auf, Ansbach-Bayreuth!

Up, Ansbach-Dragoons!
Up, Ansbach-Bayreuth!
Buckle on your sabre
and brace yourself for battle!
Prince Charles has appeared
on Friedberg's heights
himself to look at
the Prussian Army.
Refrain:
𝄆 So, boys, be jolly
and all ready to go.
Up, Ansbach Dragoons!
Up, Ansbach-Bayreuth! 𝄇

Have no worries,
Colonel von Schwerin, (Note: Refers to Otto Magnus von Schwerin, the regiment's Colonel. He is not to be confused with his contemporary Kurt Christoph Graf von Schwerin (no relation), the famous Prussian Field Marshal.)
A Prussian Dragoon
does not flee, never!
And they (Note: "They" refers to the Austrians, still positioned on the Friedburg Heights above them.) also still stand
so close together on Friedberg's height,
We could ride them down
like spring snow. (Note: The uniforms of the allied Austrian and Saxon forces were white, like fresh snow. The speaker is boasting that the close-packed white-coated Austrians would melt away before the Dragoons' charge like a field of springtime snow.)
Refrain
Whether sabre, whether cannon,
whether musket, threaten us:
Up, Ansbach Dragoons!
Up, Ansbach-Bayreuth!
So, boys, be jolly
and all ready to go:
Up, Ansbach Dragoons!
Up, Ansbach-Bayreuth!

Halt, Ansbach Dragoons!
Halt, Ansbach-Bayreuth!
Wipe your saber
and leave the battle;
For all around
on Friedberg's heights
Is far and wide
seen no more of our Enemy (Note: The Prussian 5th (Bayreuther) Dragoon Regiment (later renamed the Ansbach-Bayreuth Dragoons) destroyed 20 battalions of Austrian and Saxon troops and captured 2,500 prisoners and 67 regimental standards. This forced Prince Charles of Lorraine to retreat.)
Refrain:
And calls our King,
to the place we are today:
Up, Ansbach Dragoons!
Up, Ansbach-Bayreuth!
So, boys, be jolly
and all ready to go:
To the Ansbach Dragoons!
To Ansbach-Bayreuth!

== Sources ==
- Birch, Alexandra (2025). Hitler's Twilight of the Gods. University of Toronto Press. ISBN 978-1-4875-4925-1. OCLC 1474015374. OL 42398471W.
- Bly, Leon J. (2023). A History of the Music for Wind Bands, Part I. Berlin: Lit Verlag Dr. W. Hopf. ISBN 978-3-643-96654-4. OCLC 1447092479.
