= 2nd (Pomeranian) Cuirassier Regiment "Queen" =

Cuirassier Regiment "Queen" (Pomeranian) No. 2 Kürassier-Regiment "Königin" (Pommersches) Nr. 2
- Active: 1717-1918
- Disbanded: 1919
- Allegiance: Prussia; German Empire
- Branch: Army
- Type: Cavalry
- Role: Dragoon and Cuirassier regiment
- Size: 10 squadrons
- Garrison/HQ: Pasewalk
- Nickname: Bayreuth Dragoons
- March: Hohenfriedberger Marsch
- Engagements: War of Austrian Succession • Mollwitz • Chotusitz • Hohenfriedberg; Seven Years' War • Siege of Pirna • Prague; French Revolutionary Wars • Jena-Auerstedt; War of the Sixth Coalition • Ligny • Waterloo; Second Schleswig War; Austro-Prussian War • Königgrätz; Franco-Prussian War • Colombey • Gravelotte • Siege of Metz; World War I • Belgium • Northern France • Polesia • Flanders
- Decorations: Diploma by Frederick the Great

Commanders
- Notable commanders: Major Queen consort Louise (1806-1810)

The Cuirassier Regiment "Queen" (Pomeranian) No. 2 (German: Kürassier-Regiment "Königin" (Pommersches) Nr. 2) was a Prussian cavalry regiment. Formed in 1717 as Dragoner-Regiment Nr.5 Bayreuth Dragoner it was originally a dragoon regiment and was part of the Prussian order of battle until 1918. The Bayreuth Dragoons achieved fame for their role in winning the Battle of Hohenfriedberg in 1745. In 1819 it was transformed into a cuirassier regiment.

Apart from short interruptions, the regimental garrison was Pasewalk in Western Pomerania from 1721 to 1919.

== History ==
=== Pre-Napoleonic ===
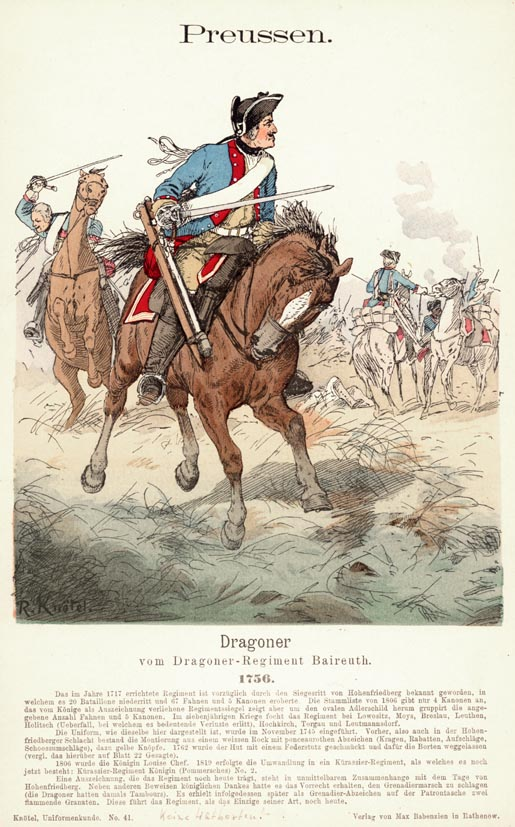
Dragoons of Dragoner-Regiment Nr. 5 depicted by Richard Knötel

The Prussian Dragoner-Regiment Nr. 5 was formed by a royal order on 2 April 1717. The new formation was to be sponsored by Oberst Achaz von der Schulenburg and raised from recruits in the Duchies of Ansbach and Bayreuth. by 1 June the regiment was formed, with 44 officers and NCOs and 295 cavalry troopers, all aged between 20 and 40 years old. By 1718, the regiment had expanded to four squadrons comprising 689 men.

It was not until 1730 that the regiment reached its full size, ten squadrons, a total of 62 officers, 120 NCOS, standard bearers, 30 drummers and 1,320 cavalry troopers. On 7 August 1731 the regiment was granted the honor title Bayreuth Dragoner (Bayreuth Dragoons) and was redesignated Dragoner-Regiment Nr. 5 Bayreuth Dragoner.

The regiment wore the standard powder blue coat of the Prussian dragoons with crimson turnbacks and facings.

The regiment first saw action during the War of Austrian Succession. At the Battle of Mollwitz, six squadrons of the regiment were engaged on an attack on the Austrian's left wing. This attack caused the enemy to retreat and brought victory for the Prussian king, Frederick the Great.

At the Battle of Chotusitz, the regiment did not fare as well. During two cavalry attacks, the Bayreuth Dragoons failed to break through the enemy lines and suffered heavy losses including 14 officers, and three standards.

The regiment won its reputation at the Battle of Hohenfriedberg. The Austrian commander, Prince Charles Alexander of Lorraine, was holding against repeated Prussian infantry attacks. The commander of the Bayreuth Dragoons, Generalleutnant Gessler, saw an opportunity to attack a large force of Austrian infantry attacking the exhausted Prussian infantry. The ten squadrons of the regiment formed into two columns and charged into the Austrians. In the fighting that followed, the Bayreuth Dragoons destroyed 20 Austrian and Saxon battalions, took 2,500 prisoners, and captured 67 regimental standards, losing only 6 officers and 28 men killed. Prinz Karl was forced to retreat in disarray, and the battle was won.

After the charge at Hohenfriedberg, the regiment was permitted to wear a golden 67 on their cartridge cases. They also received a diploma from Frederick the Great, naming all officers who took part in the charge and praising the regiment, as well as granting them their own regimental march, the Hohenfriedberger Marsch, composed by Frederick himself.

Although the regiment was present at the Battle of Soor, it did not see any action, arriving just before the Austrian defeat.

With the outbreak of the Seven Years' War in 1756, the regiment was in the vanguard of the Prussian advance into Saxony. At the Battle of Lobositz, the regiment was involved in the two failed cavalry charges against the Austrians on the Homolka-berg. The regiment performed as well as could be expected, with two squadrons rescuing the Gardes du Corps from annihilation.

The dragoons participated in the Siege of Pirna, and on 6 May 1757 took part in the bitterly fought Battle of Prague.

In the French Revolutionary Wars the regiment marched southwest in 1792 to fight in northern France in the Palatinate and Baden. In the battle of Jena-Auerstedt against Napoleon it was almost routed.

=== Coalition wars and onwards ===
In 1806, Queen consort Louise of Prussia became Colonel-in-Chief of the regiment. Subsequently, it was renamed to Königin-Dragoner (The Queen's Dragoons) per royal order on 5 March 1806. After the death of the Queen a royal order from 4 August 1810 declared that the regiment should forever bear the name "Regiment of the Queen" (Regiment der Königin). Thus it was called Regiment Königin-Dragoner until 5 November 1816. On 6 November 1816 it was renamed to 1. Dragoner Regiment (Königin) (1st Dragoon Regiment (Queen)). From 28 May 1819 on it was restructured into a cuirassier regiment and was then called 2. Kürassier Regiment Königin. Its final name was awarded on 4 June 1860, Kürassier Regiment "Königin" (Pommersches) Nr. 2 (Cuirassier Regiment "Queen" (Pomeranian) No. 2).

In the War of the Sixth Coalition, the Queen's Dragoons fought in the battle of Ligny, the battle of Waterloo and at Meaux in 1815/1816.

The regiment was mobilised in the Second Schleswig War and went to war but did not see considerable action.

In the Austro-Prussian War of 1866, the cuirassiers took part in the battle of Königgrätz amongst others.

During the Franco-Prussian War, the regiment fought at Colombey on 14 August and at Gravelotte on 18 August 1870. From 1 September to 29 October 1870 the regiment was part of the army that besieged Metz and Thionville. After that followed engagements near Beaune la Rolande, Monnaie, Danzé and on 6 and 7 January 1871 at St. Amand and Villechauve-Villeporcher.

=== World War I ===
The regiment's campaigns in World War I were mostly in cooperation with the 2nd Pomeranian Uhlan Regiment No. 9 as part of the 3rd Cavalry Brigade/6th Cavalry Division. Engagements and tasks include:

- 1914: Advance through Belgium and subsequent fighting in northern France
- 1915: Second Battle of the Masurian Lakes
- 1916: Static warfare in the swamps of Polesia
- 1917: Patrolling in Belgium and begin of infantry drill
- 1918: Abandoning of the horses and restructuring into a mounted infantry regiment within 6th Mounted Infantry Division. Fighting in Flanders and at Cambrai.

After the ceasefire the regiment retreated home to Pomerania. It was formally disbanded in 1919.

== Regimental Sponsors ==
- Generalleutnant Achaz von der Schulenburg - (2 Apr 1717 - 7 Aug 1731)
- Generalleutnant Markgraf Friedrich Erbprinz von Bayreuth (7 Aug 1731 - ? May 1763)
- Generalleutnant Friedrich Christian Markgraf von Bayreuth (? May 1763 - 2 Aug 1769)
- Generalleutnant Christian Friedrich Carl Alexander Markgraf von Ansbach und Bayreuth (2 Aug 1769 - 5 Mar 1806)
- Major Queen consort Louise (5 Mar 1806 - 4 Aug 1810)

From 1810 onwards the regiment was sponsored by the Prussian Queen until 1918.

== See also ==
- List of Imperial German cavalry regiments
