= Alte Kameraden =

German military march

- March by Carl Teike
- English: "Old Comrades"
- Catalogue: Armeemarschsammlung HM II, 150
- Composed: 1889: Germany

"Alte Kameraden" ("Old Comrades") is the title of a popular German military march by Carl Teike. It is included in the Armeemarschsammlung as HM II, 150.

== History ==
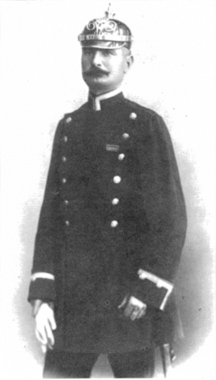
Carl Teike in 1895

The march was written around 1889 in Ulm, Germany, by military music composer Carl Teike. Teike wrote many pieces for the marching band of Grenadier-Regiment König Karl (5. Württembergisches) No. 123. When bringing his newly composed march to the regiment, the Kapellmeister Oelte simply told him: "We've got plenty enough of musical marches, put this one in the stove!" This episode eventually led to Teike taking his leave of the band and naming the march as "Alte Kameraden". A publisher purchased the song from him for 25 German Goldmark. In 1895, the Nowaweser Kapelle Fritz Köhler premiered the march. Alte Kameraden later became one of the most popular marches in the world. It was played in 1937 at the coronation ceremony for English King George VI. The march can also be heard in the film The Blue Angel (1930). Teike later worked as a police officer but also continued composing military marches.

According to one source, the march became popular among Finnish amateur photography clubs after "kameraden" was mistranslated to "cameramen" in Finnish.

It is the official parade march for the Chilean Air Force's Non Commissioned Officers School. ("Escuela de Especialidades Sargento 1.º Adolfo Menadier Rojas").

A piece of music written for the North Korean military parade for the 75th anniversary of the founding of the Workers' Party of Korea on 10 October 2020 quotes the tune of "Alte Kameraden".

== Music ==
"Alte Kameraden"
Recorded c. 1905–10

== Lyrics ==
Alte Kameraden auf dem Marsch durchs Land
Schließen Freundschaft felsenfest und treu.
Ob in Not oder in Gefahr,
Stets zusammen halten sie auf's neu.

Old comrades on the march through the country
Hold friendship rock solid and true.
Whether in need or in danger
Always together they keep it new.

Zur Attacke geht es Schlag auf Schlag,
Ruhm und Ehr soll bringen uns der Sieg,
Los, Kameraden, frisch wird geladen,
Das ist unsere Marschmusik.

During the attack, things happen fast,
Victory will bring us glory and honor,
Come, comrades, we shall reload,
This is our marching music.

Im Manöver zog das ganze Regiment
Ins Quartier zum nächsten Dorfhauselement
Und beim Wirte das Geflirte
Mit den Mädels und des Wirtes Töchterlein.

During maneuvers, the whole regiment
Took quarters in a nearby village
And at the inn we had a flirt
With the girls and the landlord's daughter.

Lachen scherzen, lachen scherzen, heute ist ja heut'
Morgen ist das ganze Regiment wer weiß wie weit.
Kameraden, ja das Scheiden ist nun einmal unser Los,
Darum nehmt das Glas zur Hand und wir rufen "Prost".

Laughing joking, laughing joking, today is today
Tomorrow the whole regiment will be who knows how far away.
Comrades, that parting is truly now our fate
So take up the glass and we shout "Cheers".

Alter Wein gibt Jugendkraft;
Denn es schmeckt des Weines Lebenssaft.
Sind wir alt, das Herz bleibt jung
Und gewaltig die Erinnerung.

Old wine gives the strength of youth,
Because the taste of wine is the elixir of life.
Even if we are old, the heart stays young
And grand the memories.

Ob in Freude, ob in Not,
Bleiben wir getreu bis in den Tod.
Trinket aus und schenket ein
Und laßt uns alte Kameraden sein.

Whether in joy, whether in need,
We remain faithful unto death.
Drink up and pour again
And let's be old comrades.

Sind wir alt, das Herz bleibt jung,
Schwelgen in Erinnerung.
Trinket aus und schenket ein
Und laßt uns alte Kameraden sein.

Even if we are old, the heart stays young,
Delighting in memories.
Drink up and pour again
And let's be old comrades.
