= Badonviller =

- Commune
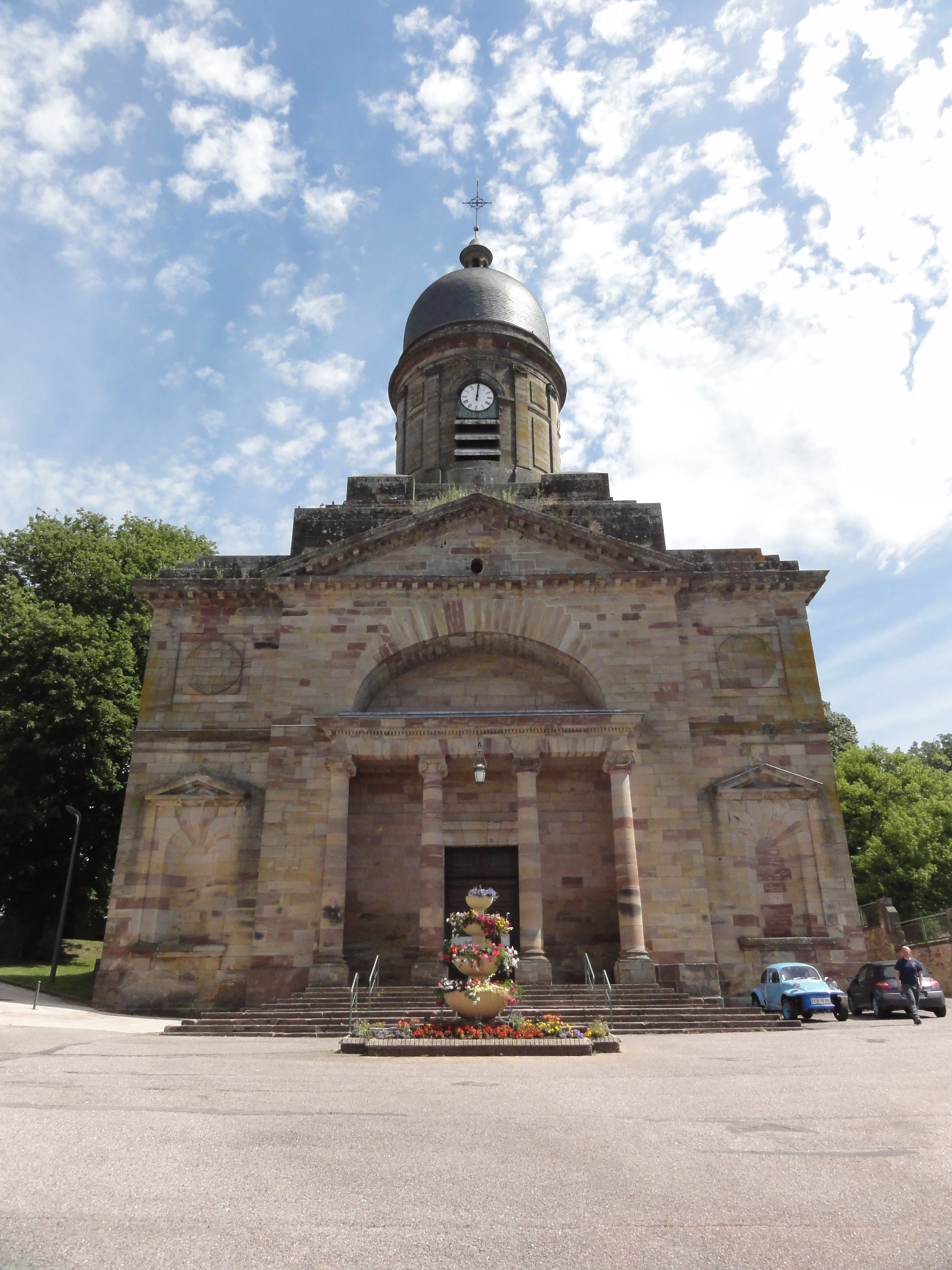
- The church in Badonviller

- Coat of arms
- Location of Badonviller
- Location within France Location within Grand Est
- Coordinates: 48°29′52″N 6°53′40″E
- Country: France
- Region: Grand Est
- Department: Meurthe-et-Moselle
- Arrondissement: Lunéville
- Canton: Baccarat

Government
  - Mayor (2020–2026): Bernard Muller
- Area^{1}: 21.95 km^{2} (8.47 sq mi)
- Elevation: 404 m (1,325 ft)
- Highest elevation: 524 m (1,719 ft)
- Lowest elevation: 284 m (932 ft)
- Population (2023): 1,497
  - Density: 68.20/km^{2} (176.6/sq mi)
- Time zone: UTC+01:00 (CET)
  - Summer (DST): UTC+02:00 (CEST)
- INSEE/Postal code: 54040 /54540
- ^{1} French Land Register data, which excludes lakes, ponds, glaciers > 1 km^{2} (0.386 sq mi or 247 acres) and river estuaries.

Badonviller (French pronunciation: [badɔ̃vile]; German: Badenweiler) is a commune in the Meurthe-et-Moselle department in northeastern France.

== Geography ==
=== Climate ===
Badonviller has an oceanic climate (Köppen climate classification Cfb). The average annual temperature in Badonviller is 10.2 °C (50.4 °F). The average annual rainfall is 1,066.3 mm (41.98 in) with December as the wettest month. The temperatures are highest on average in July, at around 18.9 °C (66.0 °F), and lowest in January, at around 1.9 °C (35.4 °F). The highest temperature ever recorded in Badonviller was 39.1 °C (102.4 °F) on 4 August 2022; the coldest temperature ever recorded was −22.0 °C (−7.6 °F) on 14 January 1960.

Climate data for Badonviller (1991−2020 normals, extremes 1959−present)
Month	Jan	Feb	Mar	Apr	May	Jun	Jul	Aug	Sep	Oct	Nov	Dec	Year
Record high °C (°F)	18.5 (65.3)	22.0 (71.6)	26.3 (79.3)	29.5 (85.1)	33.5 (92.3)	36.4 (97.5)	38.9 (102.0)	39.1 (102.4)	33.0 (91.4)	27.8 (82.0)	24.0 (75.2)	21.0 (69.8)	39.1 (102.4)
Mean daily maximum °C (°F)	5.1 (41.2)	6.7 (44.1)	11.1 (52.0)	15.7 (60.3)	19.6 (67.3)	23.2 (73.8)	25.3 (77.5)	25.0 (77.0)	20.6 (69.1)	15.5 (59.9)	9.3 (48.7)	5.8 (42.4)	15.2 (59.4)
Daily mean °C (°F)	1.9 (35.4)	2.7 (36.9)	5.9 (42.6)	9.4 (48.9)	13.5 (56.3)	16.9 (62.4)	18.9 (66.0)	18.7 (65.7)	14.7 (58.5)	10.8 (51.4)	5.8 (42.4)	2.8 (37.0)	10.2 (50.4)
Mean daily minimum °C (°F)	−1.3 (29.7)	−1.3 (29.7)	0.8 (33.4)	3.2 (37.8)	7.4 (45.3)	10.7 (51.3)	12.6 (54.7)	12.3 (54.1)	8.9 (48.0)	6.0 (42.8)	2.2 (36.0)	−0.1 (31.8)	5.1 (41.2)
Record low °C (°F)	−22.0 (−7.6)	−20.0 (−4.0)	−18.5 (−1.3)	−9.5 (14.9)	−4.0 (24.8)	−1.0 (30.2)	2.0 (35.6)	2.0 (35.6)	−2.5 (27.5)	−7.0 (19.4)	−13.0 (8.6)	−19.0 (−2.2)	−22.0 (−7.6)
Average precipitation mm (inches)	90.1 (3.55)	80.7 (3.18)	81.1 (3.19)	68.4 (2.69)	96.5 (3.80)	85.7 (3.37)	93.0 (3.66)	84.2 (3.31)	91.1 (3.59)	94.4 (3.72)	96.8 (3.81)	104.3 (4.11)	1,066.3 (41.98)
Average precipitation days (≥ 1.0 mm)	14.6	12.8	11.9	10.8	12.7	11.2	11.4	10.9	10.8	12.8	13.9	15.2	148.8
Source: Météo-France

== Population ==
Historical population
Year	Pop.	±% p.a.
1968	2,050	—
1975	1,920	−0.93%
1982	1,812	−0.82%
1990	1,660	−1.09%
1999	1,512	−1.03%
2007	1,588	+0.61%
2012	1,579	−0.11%
2017	1,551	−0.36%
2023	1,497	−0.59%
Source: INSEE

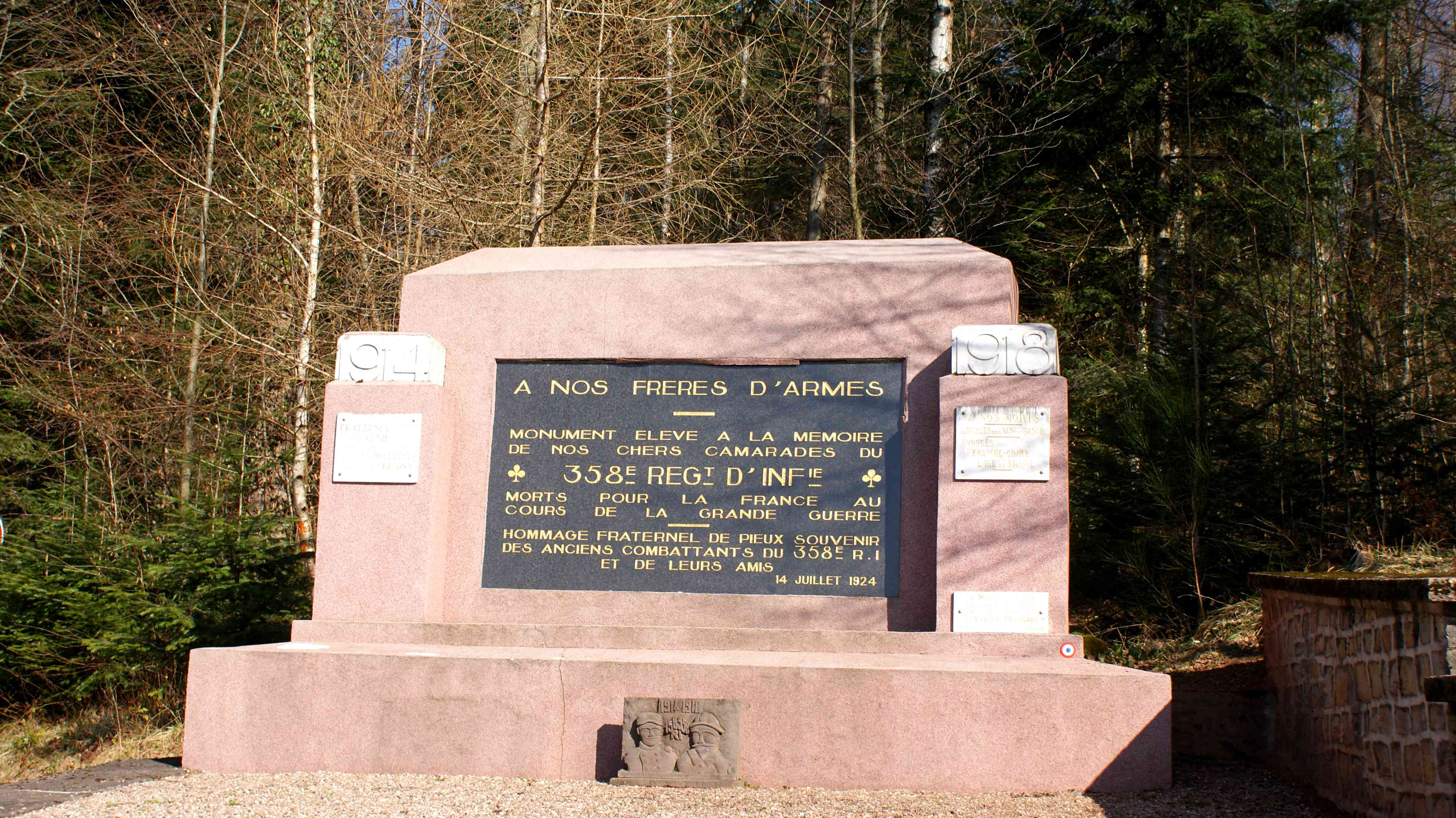
Monument of the 358th Infantry Regiment

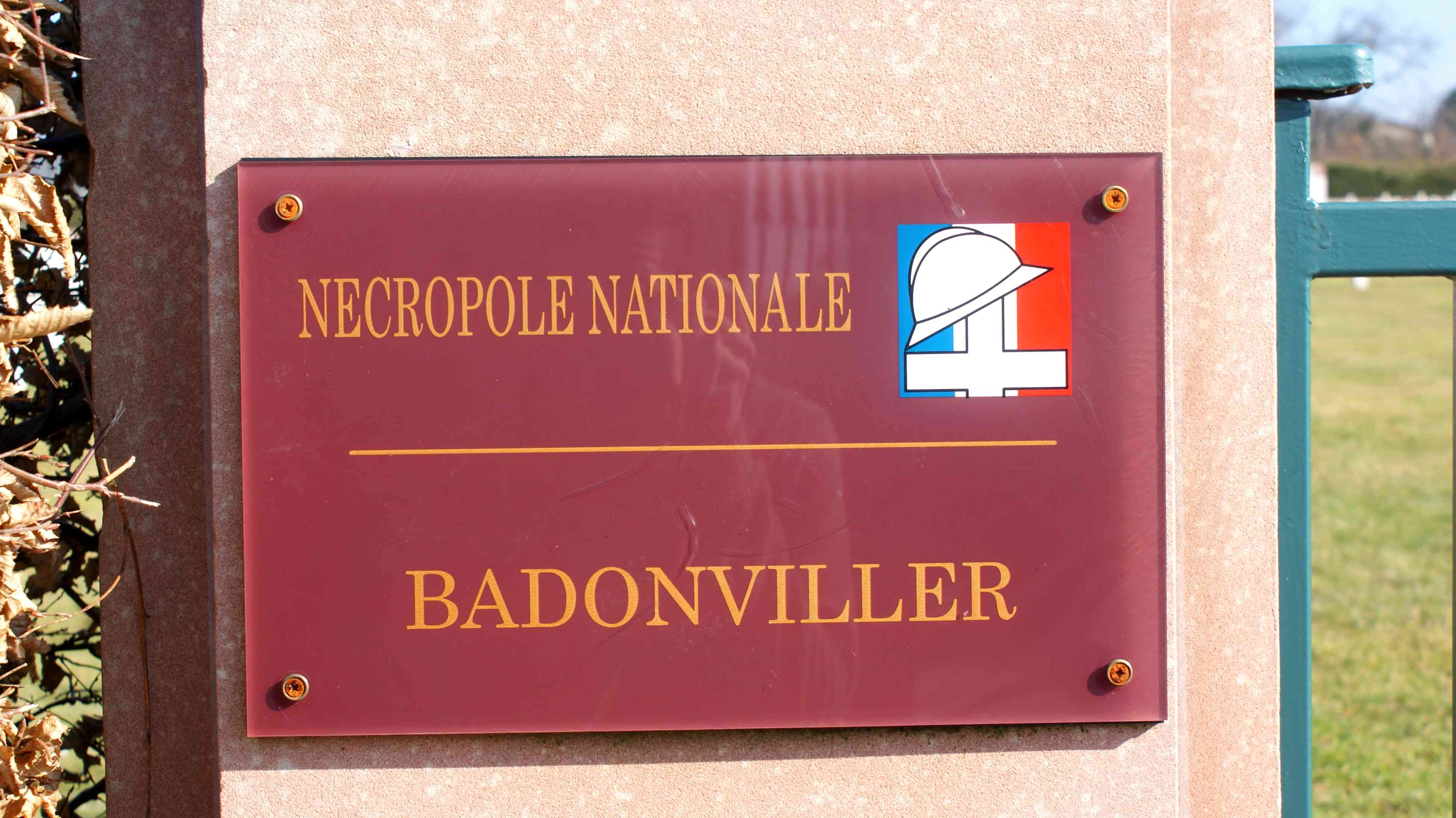
Military cemetery

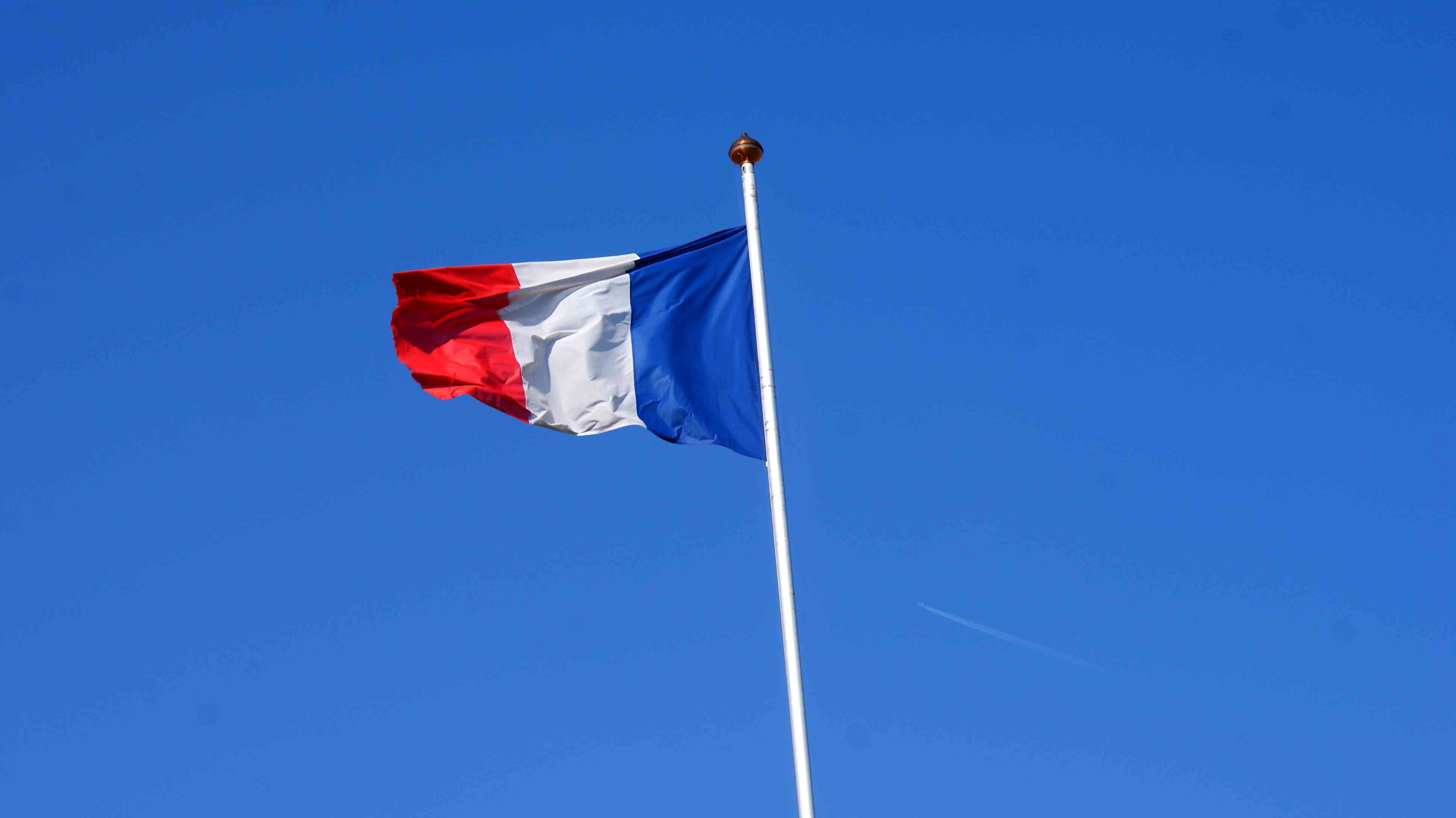
French flag in the military cemetery

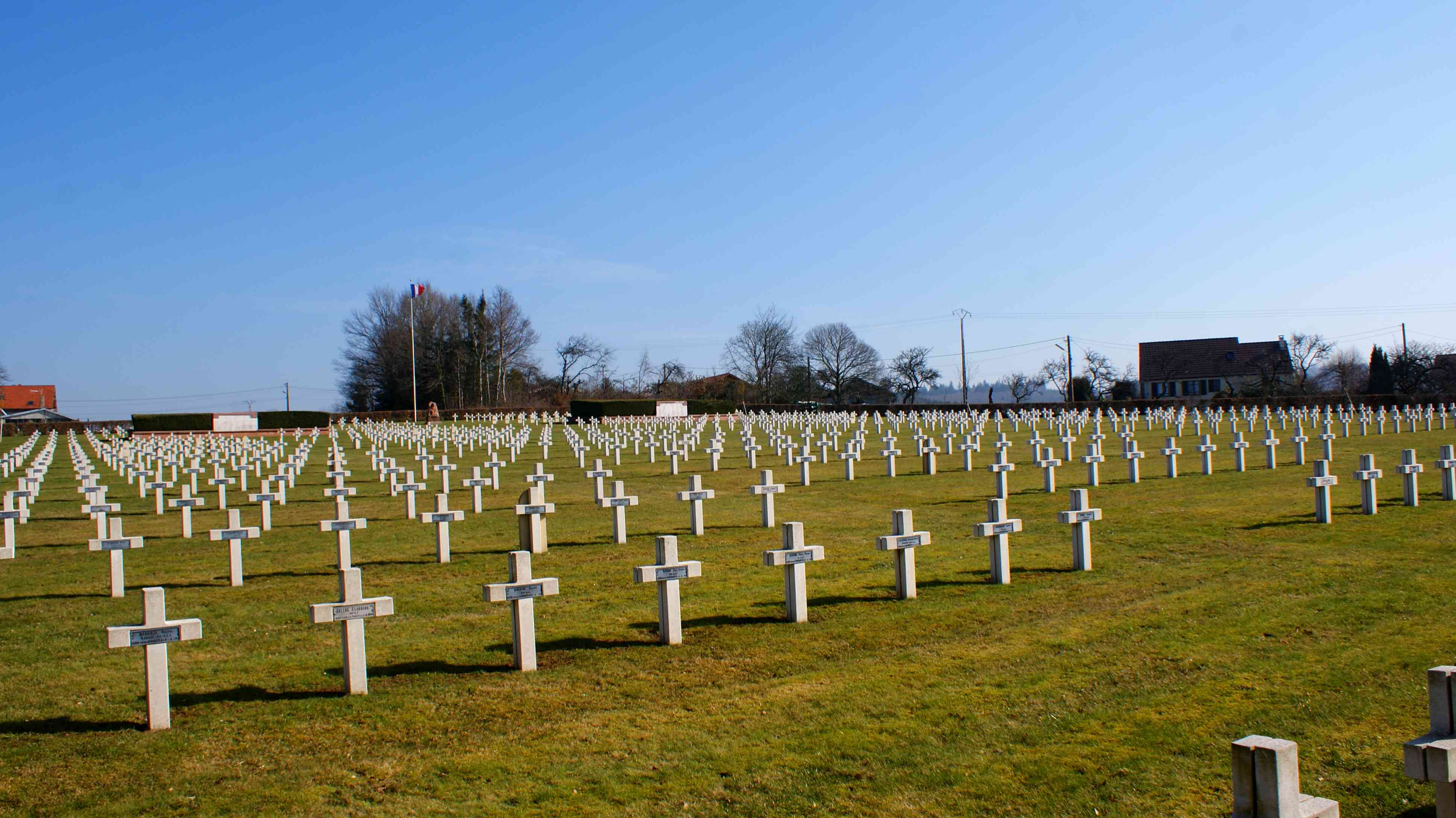
Crosses in the military cemetery

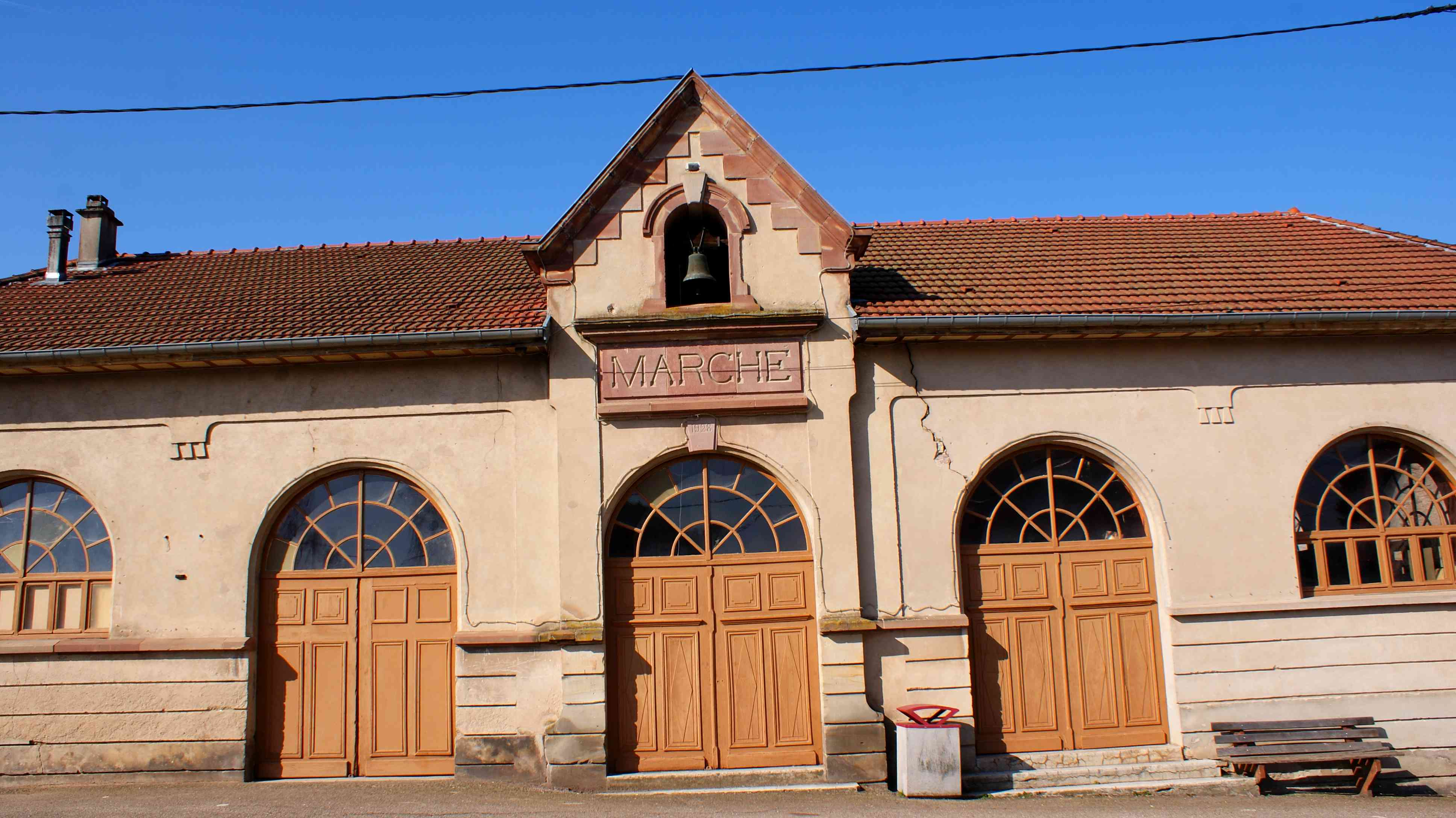
Covered market

== Personalities ==
It is the birth town of the astronomer Charles Messier (1730–1817).

== See also ==
- Communes of the Meurthe-et-Moselle department
- Badonviller March
- Badenweiler, Germany
- Antoine Sartorio
