= Badonviller Marsch =

German Military March

"Badonviller-Marsch"
- March by Georg Fürst
- Catalogue: AM II, 256
- Composed: c. 1914

Audio sample
- The United States Marine Band performing the march: file; help

The "Badonviller-Marsch" (AM II, 256) is a Bavarian military march by composer Georg Fürst (1870–1936). After 1934, with its name Germanized to "Badenweiler Marsch" by the Nazis, it was used as the official march of Hitler in his role as Führer, to signal his arrival and therefore personal presence at public events.

== History ==
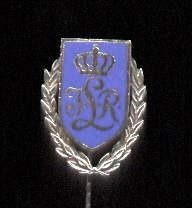
Pin of the Royal Bavarian Infantry Life Guard Regiment, which fought at Badonviller in 1914.

Fürst composed this tune as the Badonviller-Marsch for the Royal Bavarian Infantry Life Guard Regiment. The title refers to fighting on 12 August 1914 near Badonviller in Lorraine, where the Royal Bavarian Infantry Guard Regiment (Königlich Bayerisches Infanterie-Leib-Regiment) achieved a first victory against the French at the beginning of the First World War. The composer's lively two-tone entrance motif was by some accounts inspired by the duotonic sirens of field ambulances, with which the wounded were removed. This march is included in the Heeresmarsch collection as HM II, 256.

After the death of Reichspräsident Paul von Hindenburg in 1934, the march was used as a personal "Führer-Marsch" for Hitler alongside his possession of a personalised standard. As mentioned in Henry Picker's edition of Hitler's so-called "Table Talks", the march's role was to evoke the presence of Hitler as the leader of the Nazi Party and head of the German state. Hitler claimed to be the sole source of power in Germany, similar to a Holy Roman Emperor. The march had a similar formal role as the Pontifical Anthem for the Pope as the embodiment of the Holy See. Features from the National Socialist period or newsreels (e.g. Die Deutsche Wochenschau, etc.) had the march being pasted into the audio track as background music when appearances of Hitler were shown. However, the march was already often in use before the Nazis came to power. The German police order Polizeiverordnung gegen den Mißbrauch des Badenweiler Marsches of 17 May 1939 ordered that the Badenviller only be played when Hitler was present. The Germanized name Badenweiler-Marsch was introduced by the National Socialists, Badenweiler being an established, but disused exonym in standard German. It is subtitled as "The Führer's favourite march" in the 1935 film Triumph of the Will during the massive street parade through Nuremberg, at the end of which the 1st SS Panzer Division Leibstandarte SS Adolf Hitler marches off. Lyrics were subsequently added to the last section of the march by the German poet Oskar Sauer-Homburg after Hitler's rise to power in 1933. These lyrics were as follows:

Vaterland, hör' deiner Söhne Schwur: Nimmer zurück! Vorwärts den Blick! Herzen empor!
Großer Gott, schirme die Heimatflur, segne das Volk, segne den Mann, den es erkor!
Rein und stolz tönet in Süd und Nord
deutscher Sang wieder und deutsches Wort
Waffengeweiht, friedensbereit, eilet zu Hauf!
Flammendes Licht, Wolken durchbricht, Sonne glüht auf
Glockenklang kündet des Reiches Ehr',
Siegfrieds Geschlecht, rang um sein Recht, machte sich frei!
Hakenkreuz leuchtet vom Fels zum Meer.
Brüder, ans Werk, dem Führer treu!

Fatherland, hear your sons' oath: Never back! Look ahead! Hearts up!
Great God, shield the homeland, bless the people, bless the man they chose!
Pure and proud sounds in south and north
German song again and German word
dedicated to arms, ready for peace, hurry up!
Flaming light breaks through clouds, sun glows
The ringing of the bell announces the honor of the empire,
Siegfried's race fought for his right, got free!
HookedCross shines from the rock to the sea.
Brethren, to work, faithful to the Leader!

The march is often reported as Hitler's favourite. However, Hitler is quoted in Traudl Junge's autobiography, Until the Final Hour (2002), as denying that it was his favourite march, and was merely misconstrued as such because of a favourable remark he had made about it.

In 1956, the first director of West Germany's Bundeswehr Militärmusikdienst, Friedrich Deisenroth, provided a Fachdienstliche Anweisung ("specific service directive") for military bands, to avoid playing the march except in concert settings with distinctive, educational reference to the historical background. The official title is still "Badonviller-Marsch", using the French form of the name. Its connection with Nazi Germany damaged the reputation of Georg Fürst as a composer in post-war Germany. A revival of his other compositions took place in the 1990s, however. Orchestras of the Communist National People's Army started to adapt a broader range of traditional marches as early as in the 1960s, but Badonviller was left out, as were similarly the Fridericus-Rex-Grenadiermarsch and Preußens Gloria.
