= Carl Teike =

German composer

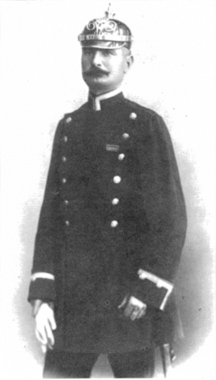
Carl Teike.

Carl Albert Hermann Teike (5 February 1864 – 28 May 1922) was a German composer who wrote over 100 military marches and twenty concert works.

== Biography ==
Born the son of a blacksmith in Stettin-Altdamm, Pomerania, Teike was the fourth of 14 children in his family. He began studying music when he was 14, playing a variety of instruments. When he was 19, he joined the army of Württemberg as a musician in the 123rd König Karls Regiment. He was stationed in the Swabian city Ulm, where he played French horn and percussion for the orchestras of local theaters.

Teike began writing military marches, including one in 1889 that would eventually be named Alte Kameraden ("Old Comrades"). Upon his bandmaster's disapproval of that composition, Teike resigned from the army. A publisher purchased the song from him for twenty German Goldmark. Alte Kameraden later became one of the most popular marches in the world.

Teike became a police officer in Ulm and married his landlord's daughter. They moved to Potsdam in Brandenburg in 1895, where he continued work as a police officer until illness led to his resignation in 1908. He eventually began working as a postal employee in Landsberg an der Warthe in East Brandenburg, where he died in 1922.

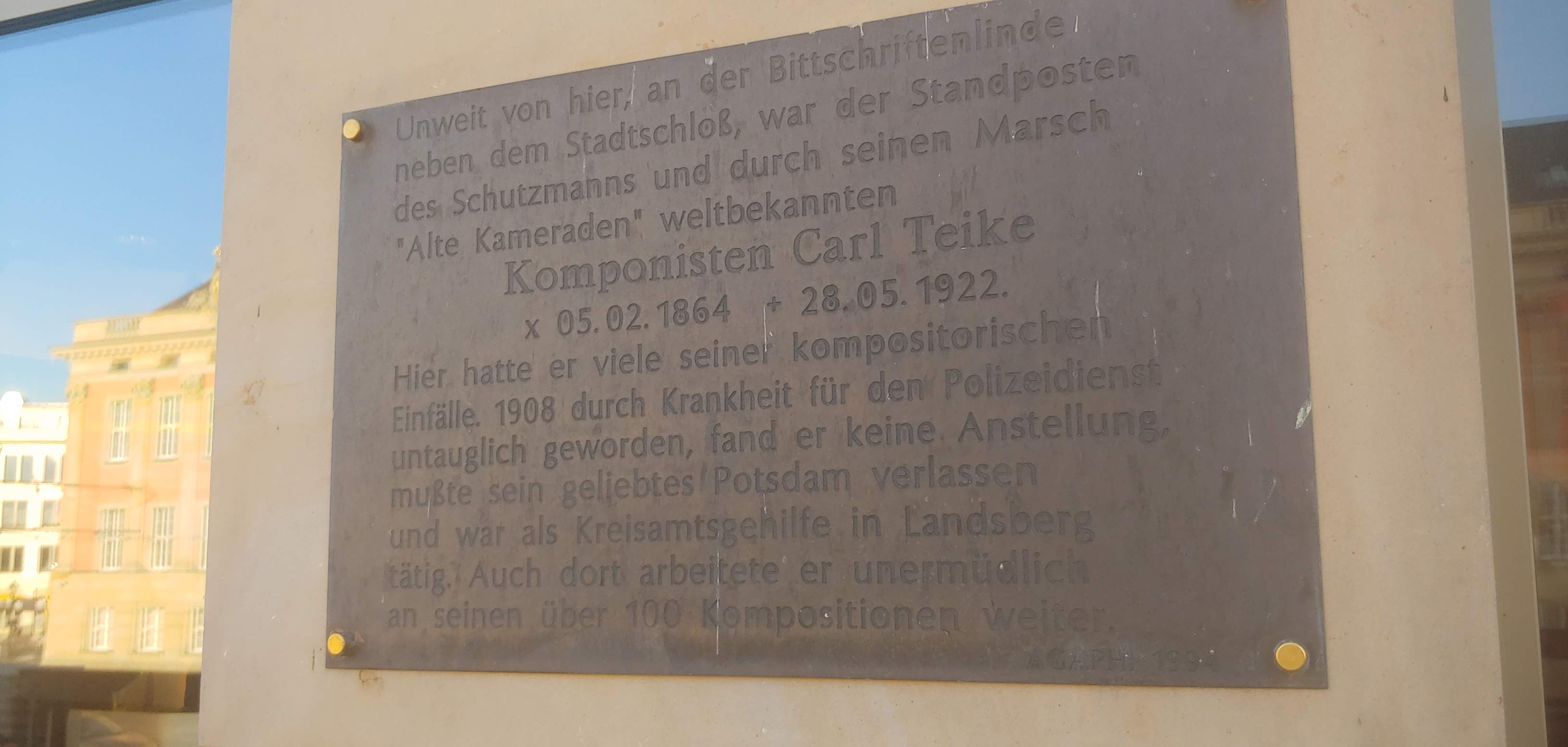
Plaque commemorating Carl Teike in Potsdam, Germany

Teike is commemorated in Potsdam with a plaque on the exterior of the Mercure Hotel.
