= Battle of Hohenfriedberg =

Prussia v. Austria and Saxony, 1745, Second Silesian War

- Part of the Second Silesian War (War of Austrian Succession)
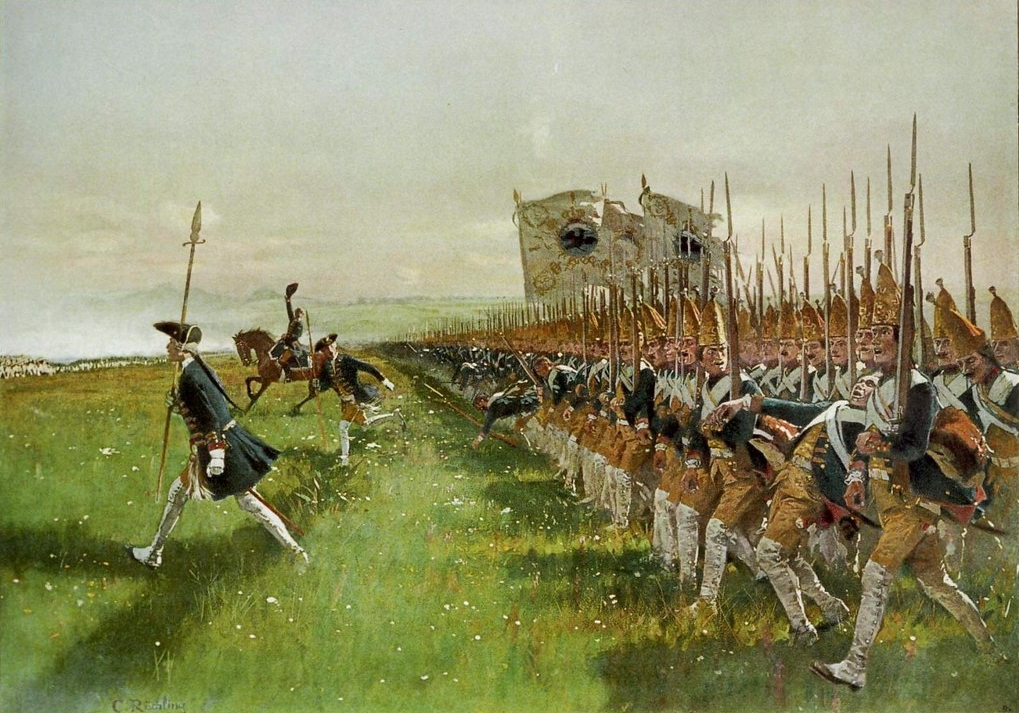
- Battle of Hohenfriedberg, The Prussian infantry advance, by Carl Röchling.
Date	4 June 1745
Location	Striegau, Prussian Silesia (present-day Poland) 50°57′40″N 16°20′40″E
Result	Prussian victory

Belligerents
Prussia	Austria; Saxony

Commanders and leaders
(Kingdom of Prussia) Frederick ll	(Habsburg monarchy) Prince Charles Alexander of Lorraine (Electorate of Saxony) Johann Adolf II, Duke of Saxe-Weissenfels

Strength
59,000; 192 guns	59,000 to 62,500; • (Habsburg monarchy) 37,654 regular army plus 2,000–3,000 hussars and Croats; • (Electorate of Saxony) 22,500 regulars, 2,600 uhlans; 122 guns

Casualties and losses
4,737	8,400 dead or wounded, 2,000 captured; • (Habsburg monarchy) almost 5,500; • (Electorate of Saxony) 4,900; Another estimate: 13,176; • (Habsburg monarchy) 10,332; • (Electorate of Saxony) 2,844; 63 guns; • (Habsburg monarchy) 34; • (Electorate of Saxony) 29

Frederick the Great
current battle
First Silesian War
Second Silesian War
Third Silesian War

The Battle of Hohenfriedberg or Hohenfriedeberg (now Dobromierz, Poland), also known as the Battle of Striegau (now Strzegom, Poland) was one of Frederick the Great's most admired victories. Frederick's Prussian army decisively defeated an Austro-Saxon army under Prince Charles Alexander of Lorraine on June 4, 1745, during the Second Silesian War – part of the War of the Austrian Succession.

== Background ==
After the Treaty of Breslau in 1742, which ended the First Silesian War, Prussia under Frederick the Great secured most of Silesia, a wealthy and strategically valuable province previously controlled by the Habsburg Monarchy. This territorial loss was a significant blow to Austria and to Empress Maria Theresa personally, as Silesia contributed greatly to Austrian economic and military power. Despite making peace with Prussia to focus on other fronts of the War of the Austrian Succession, Maria Theresa never accepted the permanent loss of Silesia. Determined to restore her dynasty’s prestige and reclaim the province, she initiated diplomatic efforts to isolate Prussia and build new alliances.

In August 1744 Frederick had launched a preemptive invasion of Bohemia. He feared that Austria, having driven the French out of Bohemia, would next seek to reclaim Silesia, which Prussia had seized in the First Silesian War. After capturing Prague, Frederick's campaign faltered due to logistical issues and a clever Austrian strategy of attrition led by Field Marshal Traun, who avoided a pitched battle. This forced Frederick to retreat back into Silesia by the end of 1744, having suffered significant losses. By 1745, Austria succeeded in forging a military alliance with Saxony, a neighboring state that also had interests in weakening Prussian influence in Central Europe. This alliance was formalized in the so-called "Warsaw treaty of alliance" (Britain, Austria, Saxony, and the Dutch Republic), but it was Austria and Saxony who would take direct military action against Prussia in Silesia.

== Prelude ==
Anticipating that Austria would exploit the weakness of the Prussian Army and realizing there would be neither military nor diplomatic aid Frederick began rearming his army. By May 1745 he had gathered an army of some 42,000 infantry and some 17,000 cavalry and 192 guns at his field headquarter near Glatz. During 28 and 29 May Frederick remained at Frankenstein. Upon receiving news on 30 May that the Austrians had crossed the border, he ordered his army to move in two columns to a new camp between Obergräditz and Reichenbach. From there on June 1, he placed the army between Schweidnitz and Alt-jauernik. Meanwhile the Austro-saxon army, some 59,000 strong, had reached Landeshut modern-day Kamienna Góra. Due to the proximity of the enemy, Prince Charles had ordered that the horses be saddled and the troops remain ready to march. However, he did not expect an attack. Moreover, the reports coming in indicated that Frederick intended to return to Liegnitz. After consulting with the Duke of Saxony-Weissenfels, Charles therefore had a new, camp set up near Baumgarten modern-day Strzegom and led the army there on June 2. The Saxons also arrived here on the same day.

=== Austro-Saxon advance ===
On the morning of June 3, the Austrian-Saxon commanders decided to advance their army into the plain between Hohenfriedberg and Kauder in order to hasten the presumed retreat of the Prussian troops. The advance was to take place in eight columns through the mountain passes; baggage and tent wagons were left behind in the rear in order to increase the combat strength of the units. The march was delayed because the left wing of the army did not reach the designated assembly point until the afternoon. It was not until after 4 p.m. that the coordinated advance of all columns began. After a short advance, the Austrian-Saxon army interrupted its march to discuss further action and night positions, as well as to reconnoiter the terrain.

In the evening, eleven grenadier companies, infantry pickets, and heavy artillery were transferred to Hohenfriedberg, while the vanguard cavalry secured the banks of the Striegauer Wasser. The right wing moved into camp between Schweinz and Günthersdorf, while the left wing did not reach its position until nightfall. The troops camped outdoors, ready for battle. The Saxon vanguard under Colonel von Schönberg secured the left wing by occupying the Spitzberge and the Breiter Berg. At around 10 p.m., Charles received news that enemy troops were advancing toward the Saxon left wing. He immediately passed this information on to the Duke of Saxony-Weissenfels. The Duke replied that he would report any new developments in his section, but that he had not received any indications of a Prussian attack up to that point.

=== Prussian advance ===
On the evening of June 2, Frederick received reports of the continued advance of the Austrian-Saxon army and therefore expected a battle to take place soon. On June 3, the Austrian-Saxon army was still in its camps in the mountains west of Hohenfriedberg. During the course of the day, the allies began to prepare to march out onto the plain. The army's quartermasters were already marking out new campsites on the plain, while the main forces still held their previous positions. Individual units, such as Nadasdy's, remained in advanced positions for the time being. While the Austrian-Saxon army made preparations for departure, the Prussian army began a night march in the evening. An advanced Prussian corps under Lieutenant General Dumoulin occupied the heights north of Striegau and Gräben with infantry and cavalry, but refrained from a direct attack on the Saxon vanguard. The main Prussian army also left its camp in the dark, with orders to remain as quiet as possible and luggage sent back to Schweidnitz. The troops moved in marching order toward the enemy army, overcoming difficult terrain, including the Polsnitz River near Stanowitz. Around 2 a.m., the main Prussian forces reached their starting position for the planned attack the next morning.

The attack was to begin with the right wing against the Saxon troops at Pilgramshain. The crossing of the Striegauer Wasser was planned in two columns. The cavalry was to march opposite the enemy's left wing, while Dumoulin's corps covered the Prussian right wing. The right wing of the infantry formed to the left of the cavalry, opposite Rohnstock. The left wing of the cavalry was supported by the Striegauer Wasser and had the town of Striegau behind it. Ten squadrons of cavalry and twenty squadrons of hussars formed a reserve behind the center of the second infantry meeting so that they could be deployed flexibly if necessary. In addition, behind each cavalry wing was a hussar regiment in the third line, which secured the flanks and rear and could be deployed to pursue the enemy if necessary. After defeating the enemy cavalry, the plan was to attack the enemy infantry, if possible from the flank or from behind. The infantry itself was to advance rapidly toward the enemy and, if circumstances permitted, attack with bayonets. If unoccupied villages were discovered during the advance, they were to be occupied in order to attack the enemy from the side.

== Battle ==
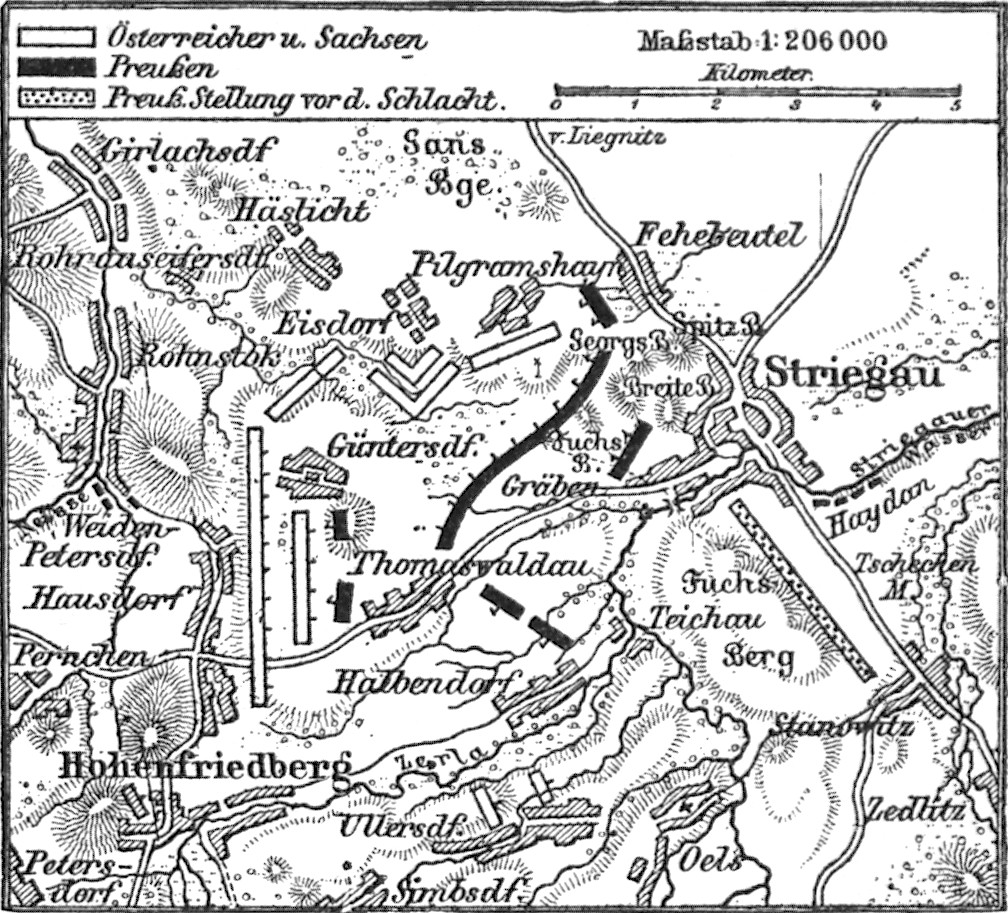
Map of the Battle

At dawn, the Prussian army advanced into an unforeseen situation. Contrary to Frederick’s expectations, the camps of the Austrian and Saxon troops extended farther east, so the leading Prussian units quickly encountered elevated terrain held by strong enemy infantry. Once Frederick learned of this, he hastened the advance of his main forces, which crossed the Striegau River just in time to be met by a substantial contingent of Saxon and Austrian cavalry. On the Prussian right, the cavalry benefited from favorable terrain, allowing them to charge downhill with numerical superiority. However, once battle was joined, the fighting quickly turned chaotic, with squadrons locked in brutal hand-to-hand combat. Mercy was neither offered nor expected, as Frederick’s cavalrymen, spurred on by encouragement to take no prisoners, sought to prove their reputation.

As the cavalry engagement raged, infantry from both sides began to arrive. The Saxon troops, previously encamped on the allied left, formed up in a zone of uneven ground that favored defenders. Supported by their regimental artillery, the Saxon line put up determined resistance. At this critical moment, Leopold of Anhalt-Dessau pulled nine Prussian battalions out of the marching column, formed them for battle, and led them forward. Additional units joined, swelling his force to twenty-one battalions. Advancing with muskets at the ready, the Prussian infantry pressed forward under heavy fire, coming to close quarters before unleashing their volleys.

Despite the ferocity of the Prussian attack, the Saxon infantry stood firm for nearly two hours, falling back only gradually and fighting for every position. Heavy casualties were suffered on both sides before the Saxons finally retreated around 7 a.m., having received no support from their Austrian allies, who were still assembling. With the Saxon withdrawal, Frederick’s initial plan had run its course. His right-wing cavalry and the infantry that had pushed back the Saxons were now too depleted to continue. Frederick therefore directed his main body, those not yet engaged, to shift left and attack the Austrians. Confusion in the orders led to one brigade being left isolated, but the Austrians did not take advantage. Eighteen Prussian infantry battalions, covered on their left by cavalry, formed up and advanced under heavy fire.

For a brief moment, the tide seemed to turn for the Habsburgs when ten squadrons of Prussian cuirassiers were cut off by the collapse of a bridge behind them. However, Prussian hussars, led by Ziethen, found a ford and crossed the river with several regiments, relieving their comrades and pushing back the Austrian horsemen. Now only the Austrian infantry remained. Like the Saxons before them, they exchanged intense musketry with the advancing Prussians, with fighting at extremely close range. The outcome remained undecided until the Bayreuth Dragoons — the 5th regiment — arrived. Rather than joining the cavalry fight on the left, they moved up behind a gap in the Prussian line. Seizing the moment, they charged a formation of Austrian grenadiers, who failed to form square in time and were overrun. The Dragoons then crashed into the main Austrian force, breaking their lines and causing a rout. In less than thirty minutes, the Bayreuth Dragoons captured sixty-seven enemy colors and took 2,500 prisoners, suffering fewer than a hundred casualties themselves. By 9 a.m., the battle was effectively over. The Austrians and Saxons had left the field, and the exhausted Prussian troops advanced only a short distance further before halting. Frederick’s forces, though victorious, were too dispersed and worn out to pursue the fleeing enemy any further.

== Aftermath ==
After the battle Frederick sent news to Berlin reporting "a complete victory over the enemy." To Leopold I of Anhalt-Dessau he wrote, The army, cavalry, infantry, and hussars have never so distinguished themselves. . . . This is the best I have seen and the army has surpassed itself On the Austrian side the defeat was a heavy blow to Prince Charles and the Vienna court. On the night of the defeat, Charles wrote to Grand Duke Francis, who was about to command the Austrian army of the Rhine, The misfortune is all the more painful to me in that our troops have behaved like idiots. Forgive this expression, but I am furious. Frederick at first hoped for decisive political results from his victory. Maria Theresia, however was determined to take Silesia back from the Prussian lawbreaker.

Hohenfriedberg was a great victory for Frederick, and soon, he was being called "Frederick the Great" by his contemporaries. The win came at a high cost. Although Frederick recorded 1,200 killed and wounded, other reports indicate that his actual losses may have been as high as 4,700. The Saxons suffered 3,400 casualties, while the Austrians suffered almost 5,000. Approximately 4,000 people were buried on the battlefield, according to one authority's calculations. 500 more Austrians and 1,500 Saxons, including four generals, were taken prisoner by the Prussians. Over the course of several days, so many deserters arrived that Frederick estimated the total Austrian losses to be twenty-five thousand.

== See also ==
- Hohenfriedberger Marsch
- Wars and battles involving Prussia
