= Johann Gottfried Piefke =

Prussian composer and conductor (1815–1884)

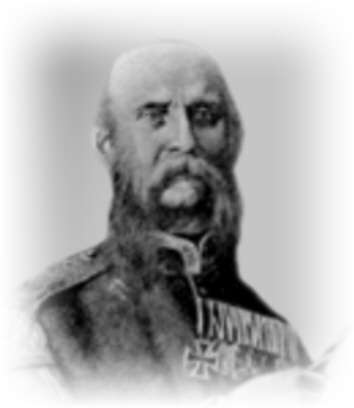
- Born: 9 September 1815; Schwerin an der Warthe, Prussia (now Skwierzyna, Poland)
- Died: 25 January 1884 (aged 68); Frankfurt an der Oder, Brandenburg, German Empire
- Military career
- Branch: Imperial German Army
- Units: 8th Infantry Regiment

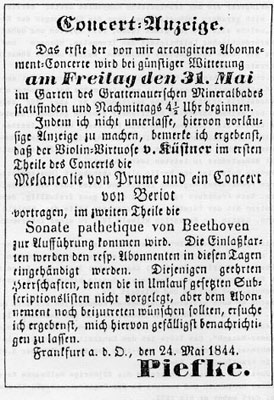
An 1844 advertisement for a musical event organised by Piefke

Johann Gottfried Piefke (9 September 1815 – 25 January 1884) was a German band leader, (Kapellmeister) and composer of military music.

== Life ==
Piefke was born in Schwerin an der Warthe, Prussia (now Skwierzyna, Poland). In the 1850s, he was band leader for the 8th Infantry Regiment in Berlin. His famous marches include Preußens Gloria, Düppeler Schanzen-Marsch and the Königgrätzer Marsch – the latter composed after the Battle of Königgrätz in 1866, the decisive battle of the Austro-Prussian War). He arranged Franz Liszt's symphonic poem – Tasso for military band and may also have similarly arranged some of Liszt's marches. He died in Frankfurt an der Oder.

Piefke also wrote:

- Pochhammer Marsch
- Siegesmarsch
- Gitana Marsch
- Margarethen Marsch
- Kaiser-Wilhelm-Siegesmarsch
- Der Alsenströmer, a march commemorating the Battle of Als during the Second Schleswig War.
- Der Lymfjordströmer, another march commemorating the Danish War.

== Honors ==
Piefke received the following medals:

- Düppeler-Sturmkreuz, 1864
- Golden Medal of the Emperor of Austria-Hungary, 1865
- Royal Order of the House of Hohenzollern, 1869
- Iron Cross Second Class, 1870
- Prussian Crown Order, 1880

== In popular culture ==
- "Piefke" persists as a derogatory nickname for Germans in Austria.
- Piefke's Königgrätzer Marsch can be heard playing during the book burning scene in the film Indiana Jones and the Last Crusade. It was one of Adolf Hitler's favorite marches and was often played during his public appearances.
