= Preußens Gloria =

1871 German military march

Song
- English title: Prussia's Glory
- Written: 1871
- Composer: Johann Gottfried Piefke

Audio sample
- Recording of Preußens Gloria from the 1920s: file; help

Preußens Gloria, Prussian Army March Collection II, p. 240, is a well-known military march of the 19th century, composed by Johann Gottfried Piefke (1817–1884).

== History ==
=== Origins ===
"Preußens Gloria" ("The Glory of Prussia" or "Prussia's Glory") was written in 1871 after the Kingdom of Prussia's victory in the Franco-Prussian War, which led to the unification of the German states into the new Prussian-led German Empire. As part of the victory parade of the returning troops, the march was performed for the first time in public in Frankfurt an der Oder, where Piefke's garrison was based. As Piefke only performed it on important occasions, the march was unknown to a broader public for a long time. In 1909 the manuscript of the almost forgotten tune turned up and was reworked by army-musical inspector Theodor Grawert. Shortly afterwards it was included in the collection of Prussian army marches.

East Germany officially banned the march due to its connotation of Prussian militarism.

=== Present ===
Today it is one of the best known German army marches. It is often played by the Bundeswehr (lit. 'Federal Defence') at official ceremonies and state visits. It is also a standard tune in many international military bands. In Germany it is often played by non-professional bands due to its popularity. It has also been adopted by units in other armies, for example in Great Britain by the First Squadron, Honourable Artillery Company. The song is often played by marching bands in Northern Ireland. Also, it is played in military parades by the Chilean Army. It is also played by the Royal Swedish Army Band and the British Army.

== Music ==
It is performed in D♭ major and trio in G♭ major.
