= Indian Navy Band =

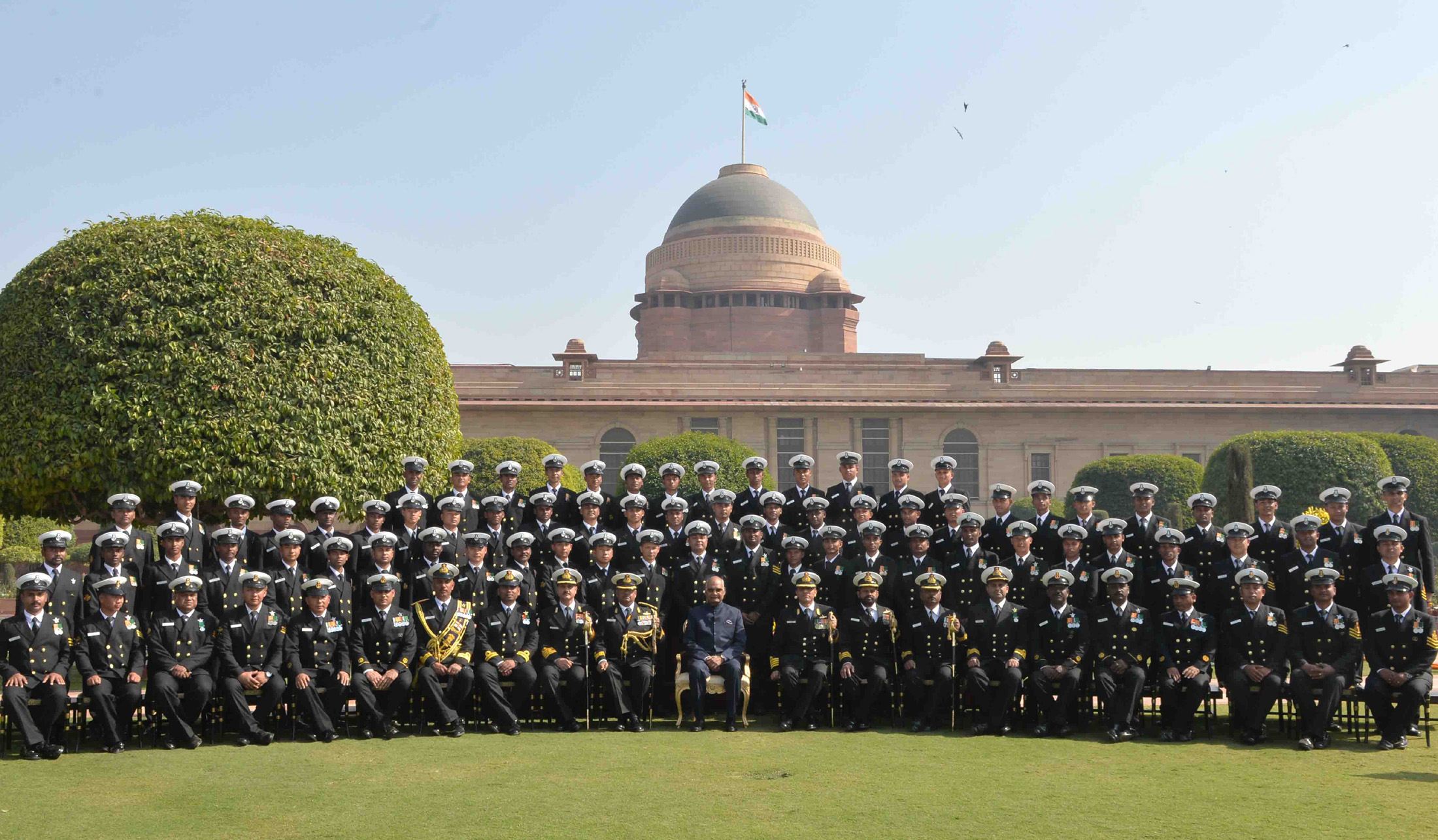
- The President Ram Nath Kovind, with the Indian Navy Band contingent for the Beating Retreat at the Rashtrapati Bhavan in January 2018.
- Active: 1945; 81 years ago
- Country: India
- Branch: Indian Navy
- Size: 125 members
- Part of: INS Kunjali
- Garrison/HQ: Bombay
- March: Jai Bharati (Victory to India)

Commanders
- Current commander: Commander Vijay Charles D'Cruz
- Notable commanders: M.S.Neer, VSM; Jerome Rodrigues; Commander Sebastian Anchees

The Indian Navy Band, also known as Indian Naval Symphonic Band, is the Indian Navy's full time music band. It was established in 1945 and is currently attached to the INS Kunjali. At the time of it commissioning, it had a strength of 50 musicians. All band members have a bachelor's degree from recognized university and can play competently in at least one military sponsored instrument.

== Symphony Orchestra ==
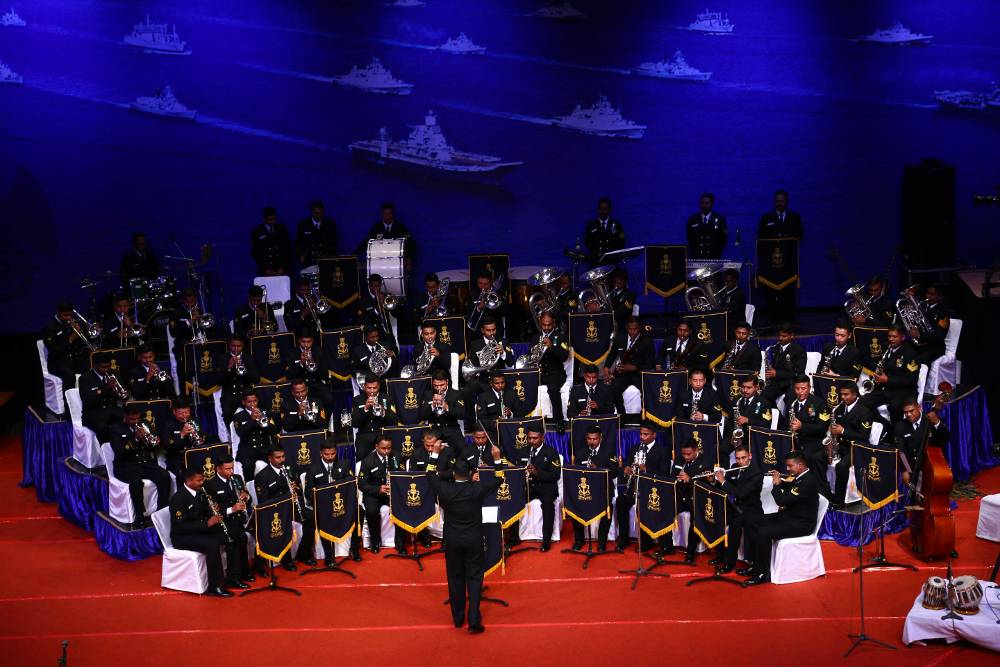
The Indian Naval Symphonic Orchestra performing during a concert held at Siri Fort Auditorium in New Delhi, 19 February 2016.

The Indian Naval Symphonic Orchestra consists of 125 musicians, all of whom perform in concert settings. Various conductors of the band in its history have increased the range of its repertoire to include arrangements of symphonies, solos, concertos and other forms of contemporary music that includes Indian classical and Western pop music. The band has also improvised on Hindustani classical and Carnatic raga in various forms and genres, particularly in fusion with the Western and Jazz music. Today, the band now uses traditional instruments such as the Mridangam, the Tabla, and Carnatic instruments. The band also has made enhancements in recent years to include the addition adding a large string section comprising violins, violas, cellos and double basses to make it a complete symphonic orchestra.

== Other ensembles ==
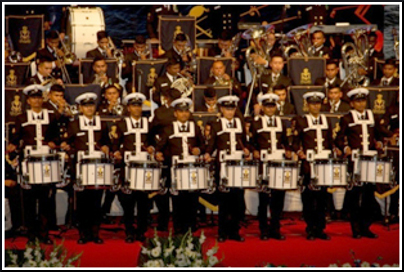
A corps of drums from the Indian Navy Band at the Royal Edinburgh Military Tattoo in 2017.

- Parade Band
- Corps of Drums
- Jazz ensemble
- Vocalist group

For the first time a combination with bagpipes instrument was played.

== Events ==
=== General events ===
The band performs at events historically and logistically connected to the Indian Navy, including Fleet reviews and Presentation of Colours. It is an annual participant in the annual Delhi Republic Day parade on the Rajpath. Sub Lieutenant Ramesh Chand Katoch from the Navy Band has set a record for leading a band contingent on the Rajpath, leading it in 20 out 30 consecutive parades. It performs at State dinners held at the Rashtrapati Bhavan, hosted by the President of India for a foreign head of state. It also performs at community events in its vicinity.

=== Others ===
It has visited countries such as France, Italy, Germany, Malaysia, Singapore, China, South Africa and Eritrea. In 1971 and 1973, the band took part in the Ethiopian Navy Day celebrations. It also took part in the 1977 Royal Navy review in honor of the Silver Jubilee of Elizabeth II. It also took part in the Australian Bicentenary review in 1988 and the PLA Navy Platinum Jubilee Parade in 2018. The same band took part in the Royal Edinburgh Military Tattoo and the Spasskaya Tower Military Music Festival and Tattoo in 2017. In July 2009, bands from the three services, with the Navy band being one, marched down the Champs-Élysées in Paris with contingents from their respective services during the Bastille Day military parade to the sound of Indian martial tunes including Saare Jahan Se Achcha, Haste Lushai and Qadam Qadam Badhaye Ja.

== See also ==
- Indian military bands
- Military Music Wing
- Band of the Brigade of Gurkhas
- People's Liberation Army Navy Band
