= Madras Sappers Military Band =

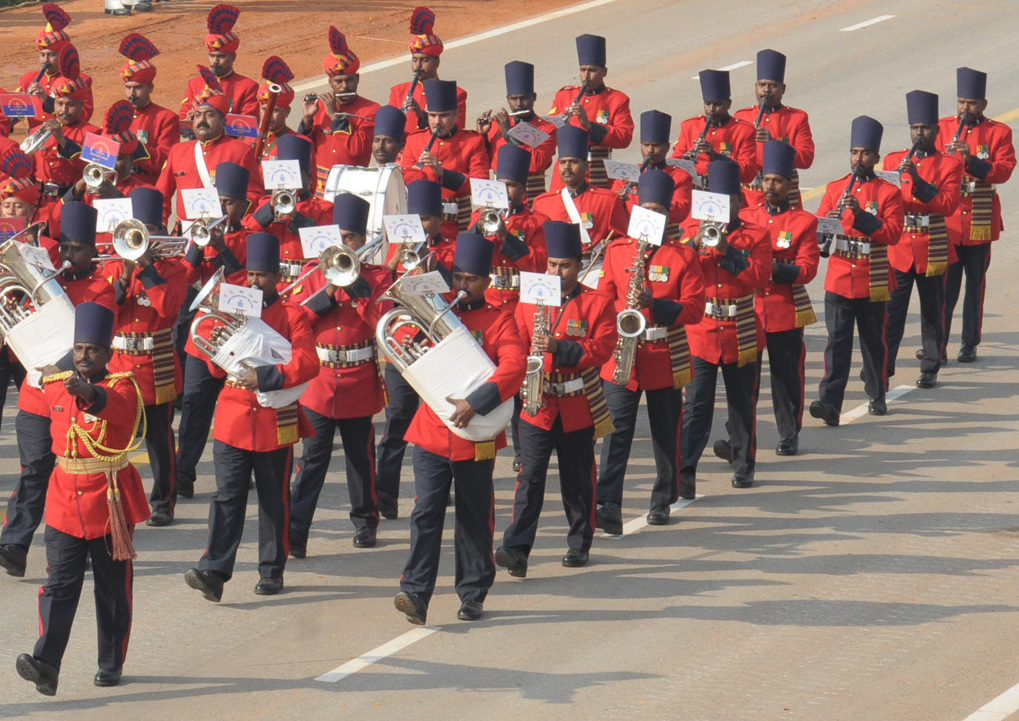
The band during the Republic Day Parade of 2012.

The Madras Sappers Military Band is one of the close to 50 Indian Army regimental bands, serving as part of the Madras Engineer Group in Bangalore. It was raised in 1951 with 30 bandsmen in its ranks. Lance Havildar Peter was the first bandmaster. The Madras Sappers Pipes and Drums was previously raised in 1934. It was selected as the ceremonial band for the Rashtrapati Bhavan in 1992.

It has performed at arrival ceremonies at the Rashtrapati Bhavan as well as events hosted by the President of India. It participates in rermemberance ceremonies in honor of those who were killed in Indo-Pakistani War of 1971 and the Bangladesh Liberation War. It has performed in various domestic parades and ceremonies such as the Delhi Republic Day parade. It has also taken part in Republic Day parades in Bangalor as well as foreign events such as the 1987 South Asian Games and 2003 Afro-Asian Games.

== See also ==
- Bombay Engineer Group and Centre Band
- Madras Regiment Band
- Indian military bands
