= IAF Band =

IAF Band may refer to:

- Indian Air Force Band
- Israeli Air Force Band
