= Bombay Engineer Group and Centre Band =

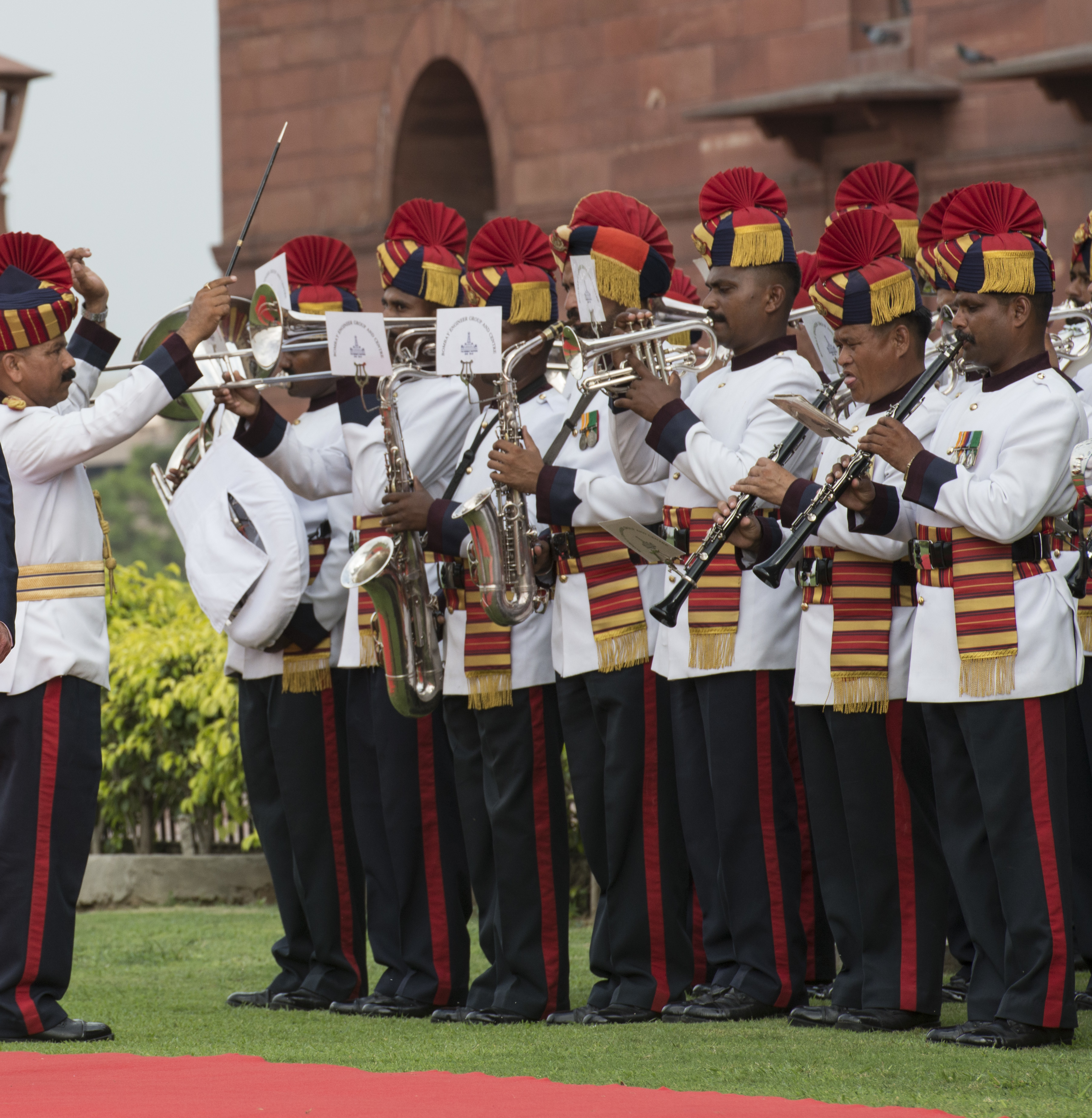
The band performing during the visit of US Defence Secretary Chuck Hagel at a Tri-Services Guard of Honour ceremony in New Delhi, 8 August 2014.

The Bombay Sappers Regimental Centre Military Band (Bombay Sappers Band for short) is a regimental military band in the Indian Armed Forces. It is one of the oldest Indian military bands in the country and is one of many Indian Army brass bands. The 30-member band is based at the BEG Centre in Kirkee. The band has a lineage that dates back two centuries and includes it being formerly known as the "Sikh Pioneers Brass Band" under the 3rd Sikh Pioneers. The modern band was founded in 1932 in Sialkot (present day Pakistan) as its current name. A jazz band was established in 1993.

The band consists of the following small ensembles:

- Sappers Symphony Band
- Parade Band
- Pipe Band
- Brass Band
- Rhythm Section
- Jazz Band (11-piece)

Like all military bands, it performs at arrival ceremonies for state visits and state dinners hosted at the Rashtrapati Bhavan by the President of India. Locally, it participates in regimental events at the BEG Centre. The band has been an annual participant in the Delhi Republic Day parade on the Rajpath since 1951. Outside the country, the band notably performed during the coronation of the incumbent King of Bhutan. The band notably took part in the production of the 1982 film Gandhi, performing Scipione during the depicted arrival of a British Army officer.

== Instrumentation ==
The brass band, pipe band, and jazz band all utilize a variety of instruments which reflect the tunes of the band. The military band itself consists of flute, piccolo, oboe, clarinet, cornet, trumpet, and trombone players. The percussion that often accompanies them include xylophones, vibraphones, and chimes. Pipe band involves three instruments: bagpipes, drums, and bugles. The jazz band has three sections from the string family: guitar, lead guitar, and bass guitar. The band also has other string instruments such as the viola and the violin. The rhythm section includes electronic drums, congo, and the traditional Dholak and Tabla.

== See also ==
- Indian Army Chief's Band
- Band of the Royal Canadian Engineers
