= Madras Regiment Band =

The Madras Regiment Band (MRC Band) is an Indian Army regimental band. It is an active duty band that serves as part of the Madras Regimental Centre in Wellington. It also serves as the de facto unit band of the Defence Services Staff College in the city. The MRC band is regarded as one of the best military bands in the Indian Army. The band consists of the following small ensembles: Symphony Band, Brass Band, and Percussion Section. The 27th Battalion also maintains its own Pipe Band. Outside the conventional musical ensembles of the military, a Chenda Melam team is also on hand.

== History ==
The band is a descendant of many military bands that operated inside the Madras Presidency and the larger British Raj. One of these include the Greater Chennai Corporation Band (now the Madras Corporation Band), which was established in 1813 as a result of a letter to the Secretary of the Commander-in-Chief of Fort St. George by a British Army Colonel, who urged the formation of military bands among the native regiments of the East India Company as a means "of improving the appreciation of European music amongst the Indian population". Around the same time, the Tanjore Royal Band was created by decree of Serfoji II. Units such as the Madras Rifle Corps maintained platoon-sized fire and Drum Corps. The band in its current form was raised in 1951 as a brass band, just four years after Indian independence. Over the years, it has evolved to also include other aspects of music. In 1994, the band won an award for its marching performance in the Delhi Republic Day parade on the Rajpath, of which it is an annual participant. It would win the same award again in 1996 and in 2001.

== Activities ==
It has performed at arrival ceremonies at the Rashtrapati Bhavan as well as events hosted by the President of India. It also welcomes Union ministers to different parts of the country. In 1999, the band took part in the welcoming of Union Minister of Railways Nitish Kumar to the municipality of Coonoor. It also participates in regimental and community events such as the MRC reunion. Regimental activities include anniversaries such as 4 December (MRC Raising Day) or 1 October (anniversary of the 25th Battalion).

== See also ==
- Indian Army Chief's Band
- Band of the Royal Canadian Engineers
- Indian military bands
