= Samman Guard =

Regimental slow march of the Indian Army

- March by L. B. Gurung
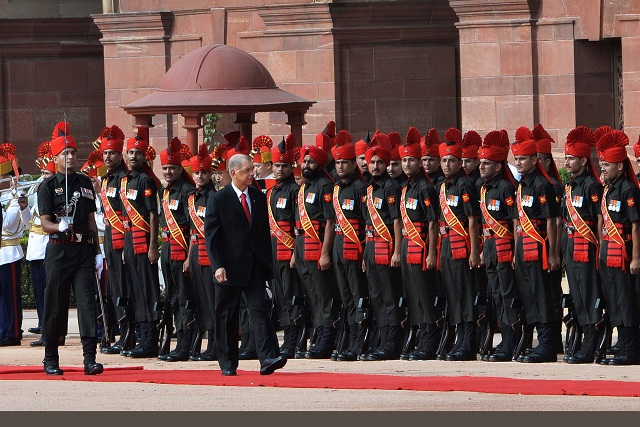
- Seychelles President James Michel receiving a guard of honour at Rashtrapati Bhawan. Samman Guard is the march played by Indian military bands during inspections of guards of honour during state visits.
- Native name: सम्मान गार्ड
- Commissioned by: Indian army
- Published: 1 January 1972
- Publisher: The Gramophone Company of India

Samman Guard (English: The Guard of Honour, Hindi: सम्मान गार्ड) is the official slow march of the Indian Army. The music was composed by L. B. Gurung. It was released under The Gramophone Company of India record label on January 1, 1972, as the last song on the Martial Music Of The Indian Army Vol. 1 Album.

== See also ==
India related

- Band of the Brigade of Gurkhas
- Beating retreat in India
- Deshon Ka Sartaj Bharat
- Indian military bands
- Indian Army Chief's Band
- Military Music Wing
- Music of India
- President's Bodyguard
- Tri-Services Guard of Honour (India)

Other related

- Guard of honour
