= Indian military bands =

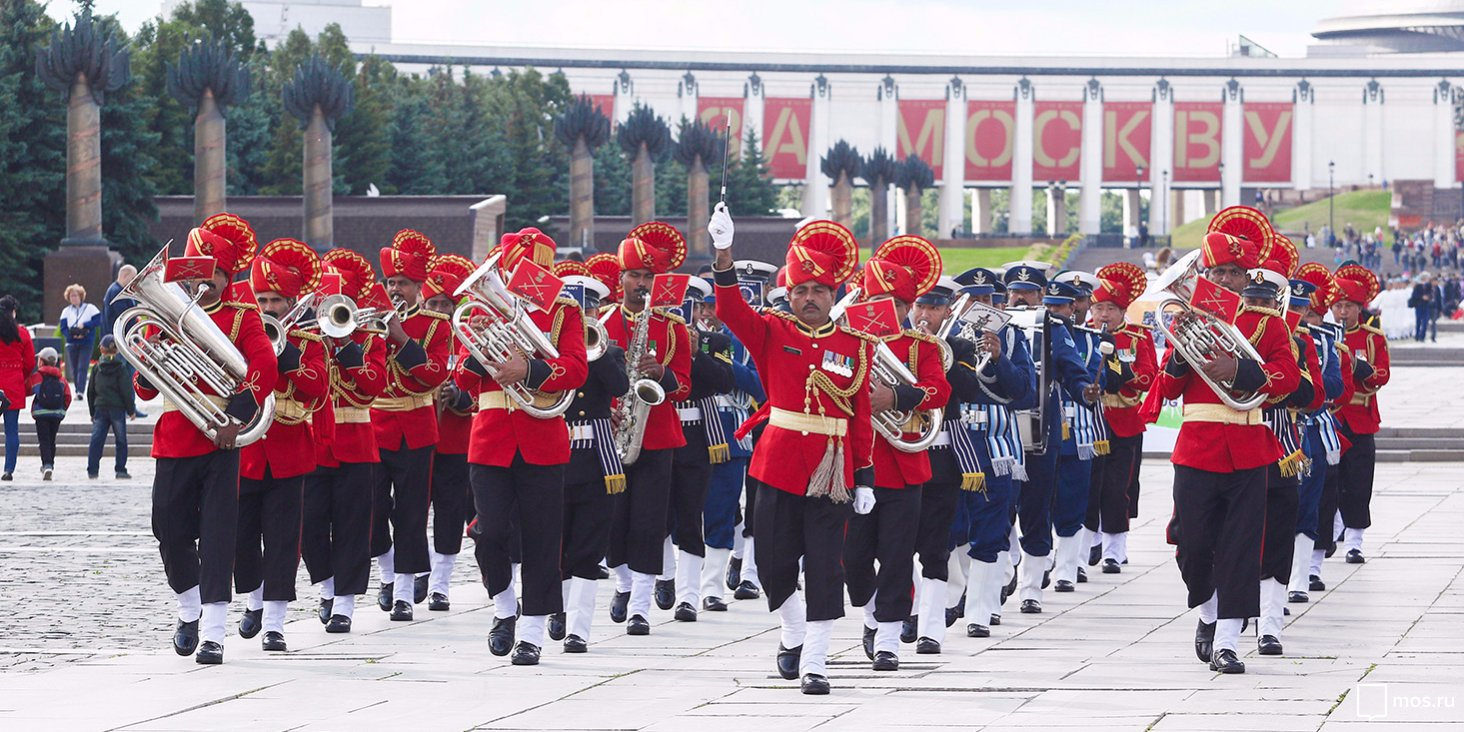
The Indian Army Chief's Band

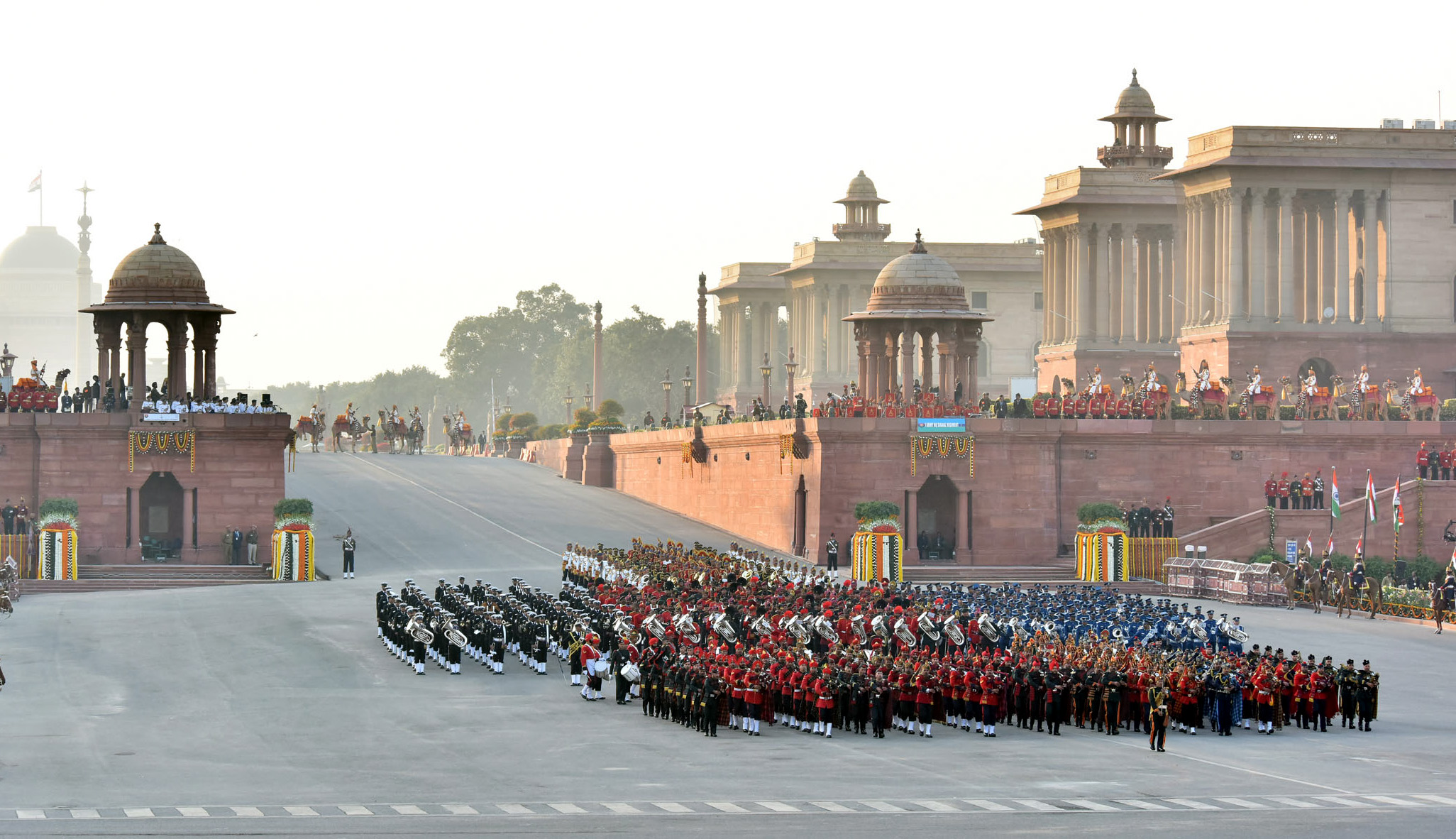
A band performance at the Beat Retreat ceremony at Vijay Chowk in 2018

The Indian military bands consists of musicians from the Indian Army, Navy and Air Force. Indian military bands regularly participate in international festivals and take part in celebrations dedicated to various national events. These bands are permanent participants in the Delhi Republic Day parade on the Kartavya Path. Today, the Indian Armed Forces have more than 50 military brass bands and 400 pipe bands and corps of drums. A Tri-Services Band refers to a joint Indian Armed Forces military band that performs together as a unit. At the Spasskaya Tower Military Music Festival and Tattoo in Moscow, the band consisted of 7 officers and 55 musicians. The Military Music Wing of the Army Education Corps is the principal educational institution of the armed forces that provides instruction to musicians of all ranks. Instruction is also provided by the Military Music Training Center and the Indian Navy School of Music.

In the Indian Army, the following commands maintain their own inspectorates for music: Eastern Command, Central Command, Northern Command, South Western Command, Southern Command, and the Western Command. The military bands in the Indian Armed Forces consist of a mix of instruments from the woodwind family, brass family, and percussion family and sometimes are simply either brass bands or wind bands. The Indian military also has dedicated pipe band bands that serves as independent units and are maintained by all infantry regiments. Most senior military bands can be configured from a marching band to a concert band and can also form smaller ensembles to jazz ensembles, traditional music bands, brass quintets, woodwind and drumlines. A general military band consists of a band master and 33 musicians while a pipe band consists of a band master and 17 musicians. Bandsmen in the Indian Army are soldiers first, having the primary role in battle of medical assistants.

== History ==
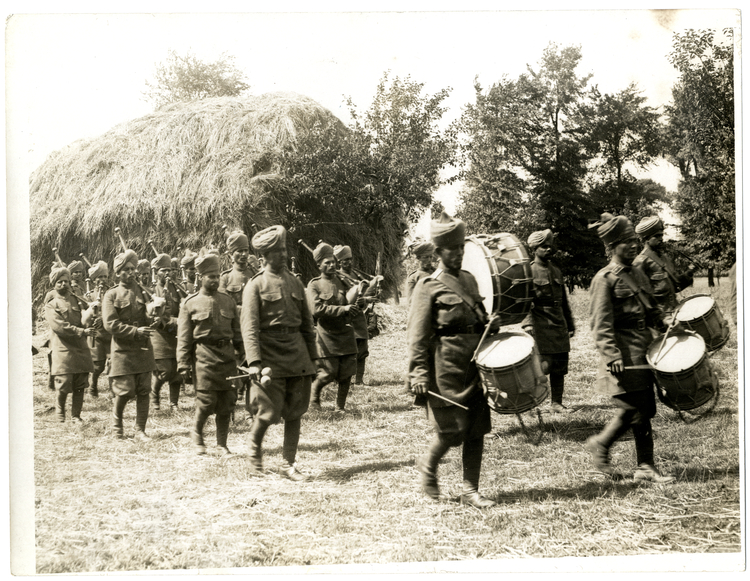
An infantry band from the 40th Pathans playing on a French farm in Saint-Floris.

Martial music has been a part of Indian culture since the era of the Maratha Empire in the 17th century. Organized military bands were brought to India by the British Army as military bands early as the 1700s. In 1813, within a letter to the Military Secretary of the Commander-in-chief of Fort St. George, an army Colonel urged the formation of military bands in the native regiments of the East India Company as a means "of improving the appreciation of European music amongst the Indian population". Prior to World War I each battalion-sized regiment of the Indian Army had its own military band.

There is no exact introduction year of pipe bands in the Indian military forces. When it was introduced it came into ethnically Sikh, Gorkha, and Pathan regiments in the late 19th century. The first fully Sikh pipe band was established circa 1856 when the 45th Rattray Regiment was established in Punjab. Since then, Sikh Pipe bands have been a part of the Sikh Regiments that were established under British rule. British Indian regiments with pipe bands included the Bombay Volunteer Rifles and the Calcutta Scottish. The Military Music Wing came into fruition on 23 October 1950 under the patronage and supervision of K. M. Cariappa, the then C-in-C of the Army. In the early-mid 50s, the Indianization of formerly British military bands took place, with Harold Joseph, the then music director of the Indian Army, leading the revitalization of Indigenous tunes in the Indian military.

== Primary bands ==
=== Indian Army Chief's Band ===
The Indian Army Chief's Band was founded in 1990 as the official band of the Indian Army and the foremost in the armed forces. It also, as its name implies, represents the Chief of the Army Staff at events involving the COAS's presence. The band represents India in most important state events held in the Indian capital. It also has represented India at various military music festivals in France, Italy, Sweden, Germany, Great Britain, Russia and Bangladesh.

=== Indian Naval Symphonic Band ===
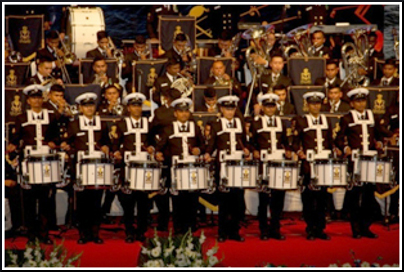
A corps of drums from the Indian Navy Band

The Indian Naval Symphonic Band has been considered as one of the best military bands in Asia. It was founded in 1945. The Naval Musicians are known as unofficial ambassadors of the country. As Musician Officers they are responsible for conducting the Naval Band at ceremonies and symphonic band concerts in India and abroad.

=== No. 1 Air Force Band ===
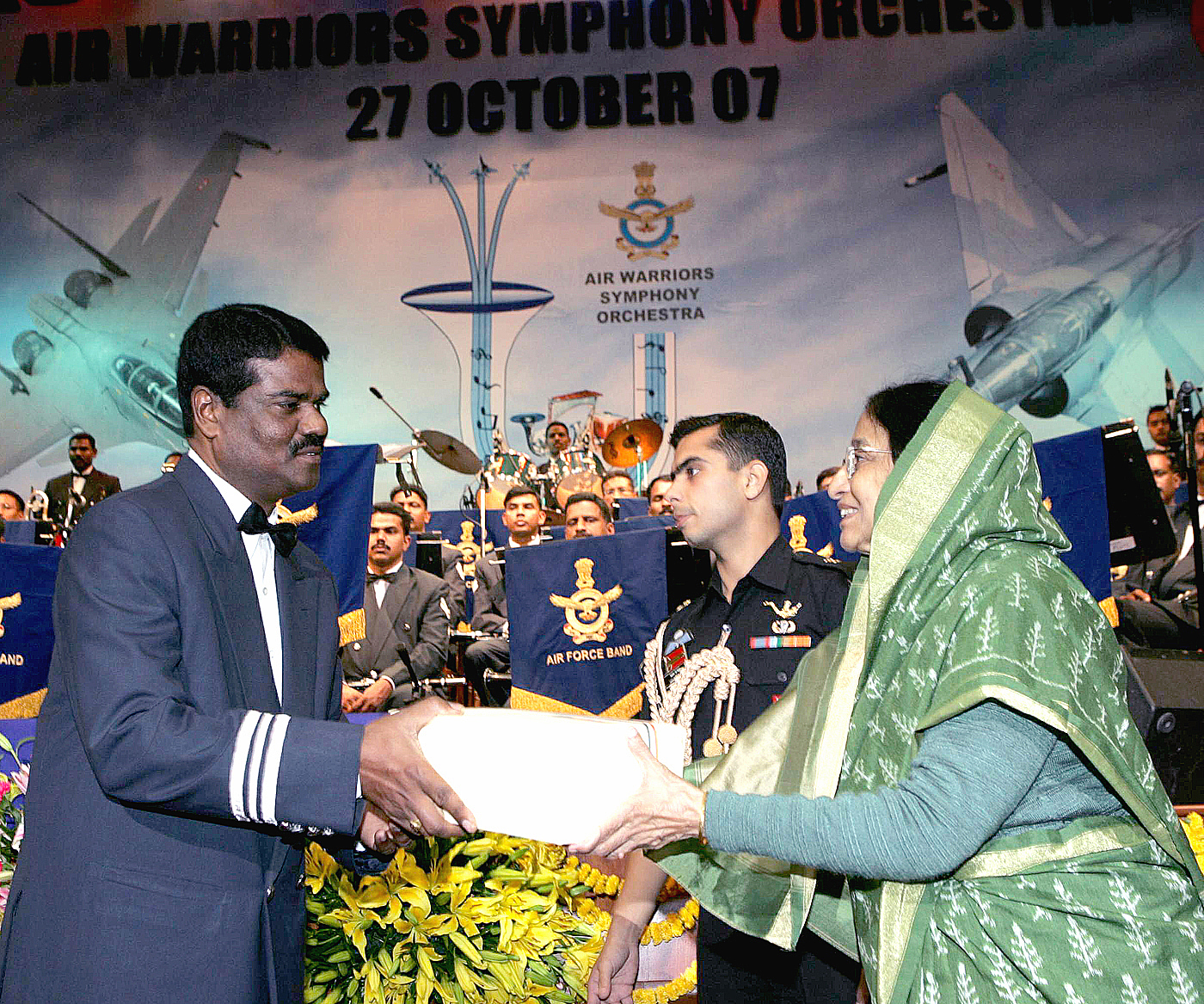
President Pratibha Patil presenting mementos to the conductor of the AWSO at the auditorium in Rashtrapati Bhavan

The No. 1 Air Force Band (also known as the Indian Air Force Band) is the primary musical unit of the Indian Air Force. The first IAF military band was formed on 10 June 1944 as the RIAF Central Band and is currently stationed in Jalahalli. The concert band unit of the IAF Band is the Air Warrior Symphony Orchestra (AWSO), formed in June 2002. The AWSO has performed at many concerts across the world in countries like France, Italy, Germany, Malaysia, Singapore, and Bangladesh. The AWSO consists of hand-picked musicians from various Air Force Bands.

== Other bands ==
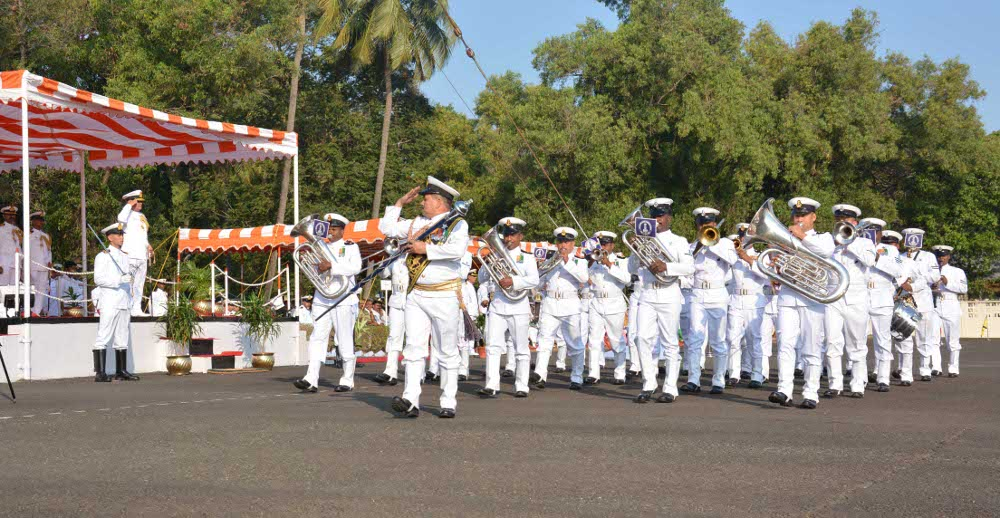
The Southern Naval Command Band marching past a saluting dais

=== Army bands ===
Army bands are directly reporting units of their regimental center or part of the educational institution:

- Artillery Centre Band Nasik
- Hyderabad Artillery Center Band
- Band of the Brigade of the Guards Training Centre
- Band of the Rajputana Rifles Centre
- Madras Regiment Band
- The Grenadiers Regimental Centre Brass Band
- Maratha Light Infantry Band
- Jat Regiment Centre Band
- Ladakh Scouts Centre Band
- 1 EME Band
- Corps of Signals Training Centre Band
- Bombay Engineer Group and Centre Band
- Madras Engineer Group and Centre Band
- Mechanised Infantry Regiment Centre Band
- Dogra Regiment Band
- The Garhwal Rifles Band
- Bengal Engineer Group Centre Band
- Parachute Regimental Centre Band
- Dogra Scouts Band
- 39 Gorkha Training Centre Band
- 11th Gorkha Rifles Centre Band
- 14 Gorkha Training Centre Band
- 58 Gorkha Training Centre Band
- Indian Military Academy Band
- Officers Training Academy Band
- Territorial Army Bands under various TA battalions
- Indian Army Grand Symphony Band
- Armoured Corps Centre & School Band
- 1 Signal Training Centre Band (Jabalpur)
- Mahar Regiment Band
- Jammu and Kashmir Light Infantry Band
- Pioneer Corps Training Center Band
- Corps of Military Police Band
- Army Service Corps North Band

=== Navy Bands ===
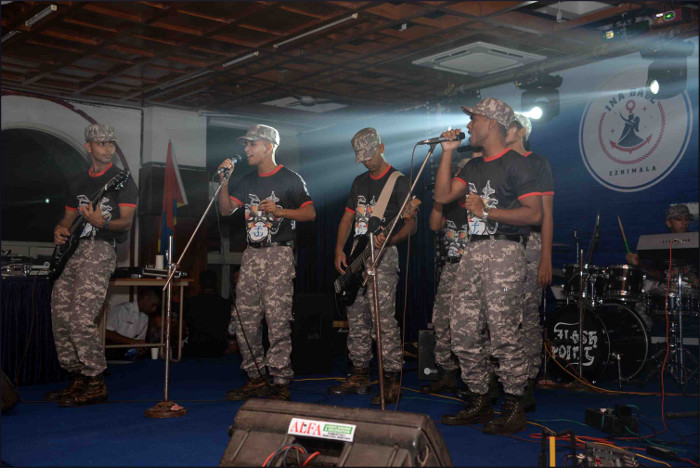
The Indian Naval Academy Band

The following bands operate in the country:

- Eastern Naval Command Band
- Western Naval Command Band
- Southern Naval Command Band
- INS Chilka Band (Orissa), serves the sailor training establishment on base
- INS Cicars Band (Fort Cochin), serves the Gunnery Training School
- INS Dronacharya Band (Fort Kochi)
- INS Hamla Band (Marve), serves under the Logistic, EDP and Cookery schools
- INS India Band (New Delhi)
- INS Jarawa Band (Port Blair)
- INS Kunjali Band (Bombay), serves in an official capacity as the Indian Navy Central Band
- INS Mandovi Band (Goa), serves the Indian Naval Academy
- INS Shivaji Band (Lonavla), serves under the Engineering Training School
- INS Valsura Band (Jamnagar), serves at the Electrical Training School
- INS Venduruthy Band (Cochin)
- INS Viraat Band

Bands often embarks on goodwill visits to different countries by means of its ship base. All navy musicians must have a bachelor's degree from recognized university and can play at least one military sponsored instrument.

=== Air Force Bands ===
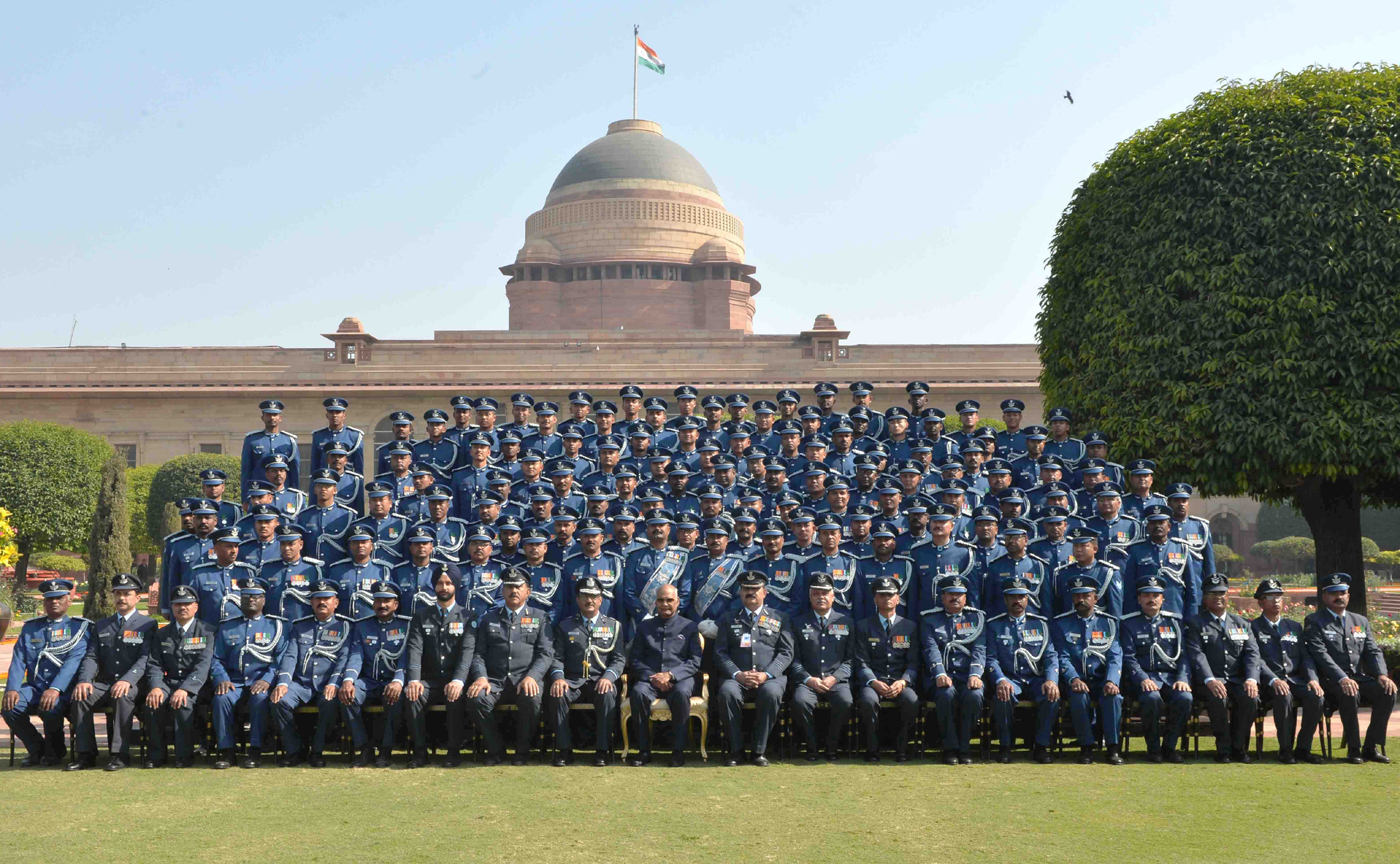
President Ram Nath Kovind with members of the Indian Air Force Band following the Beating Retreat, Rashtrapati Bhavan, 30 January 2018

Since 1944, eight regional bands have operated in the country:

- No.1 Air Force Band (Formed 10 June 1944, stationed in Jalahalli)
- No.2 Air Force Band (Formed 22 July 1949, stationed in New Delhi)
- No.3 Air Force Band (Formed 28 April 1961, stationed at the Dundigal)
- No.4 Air Force Band (Formed 28 April 1961, stationed in Bamrauli)
- No.5 Air Force Band (Formed 28 April 1961, stationed in Nagpur)
- No.6 Air Force Band (Formed 13 January 1969, stationed in Palam)
- No.7 Air Force Band (Formed 13 January 1969, stationed in Guwahati)
- No.8 Air Force Band (Formed 1999, stationed in Gandhinagar)

The current director of music for the Indian Air Force is Flight Lieutenant LS Rupachandra.

==== Air Force Academy Band ====
The No.3 Air Force Band is attached to the Indian Air Force Academy, and has been configured that way since 1971. Musicians are required to read and write in English and have a height of 167 cm. Musicians must be aged between 17 and 22 years old at the time of their employment.

In December 1996, 20 members of the band died in a plane crash involving a Hawker Siddeley HS 748 in Dundigal.

=== Pipe bands ===
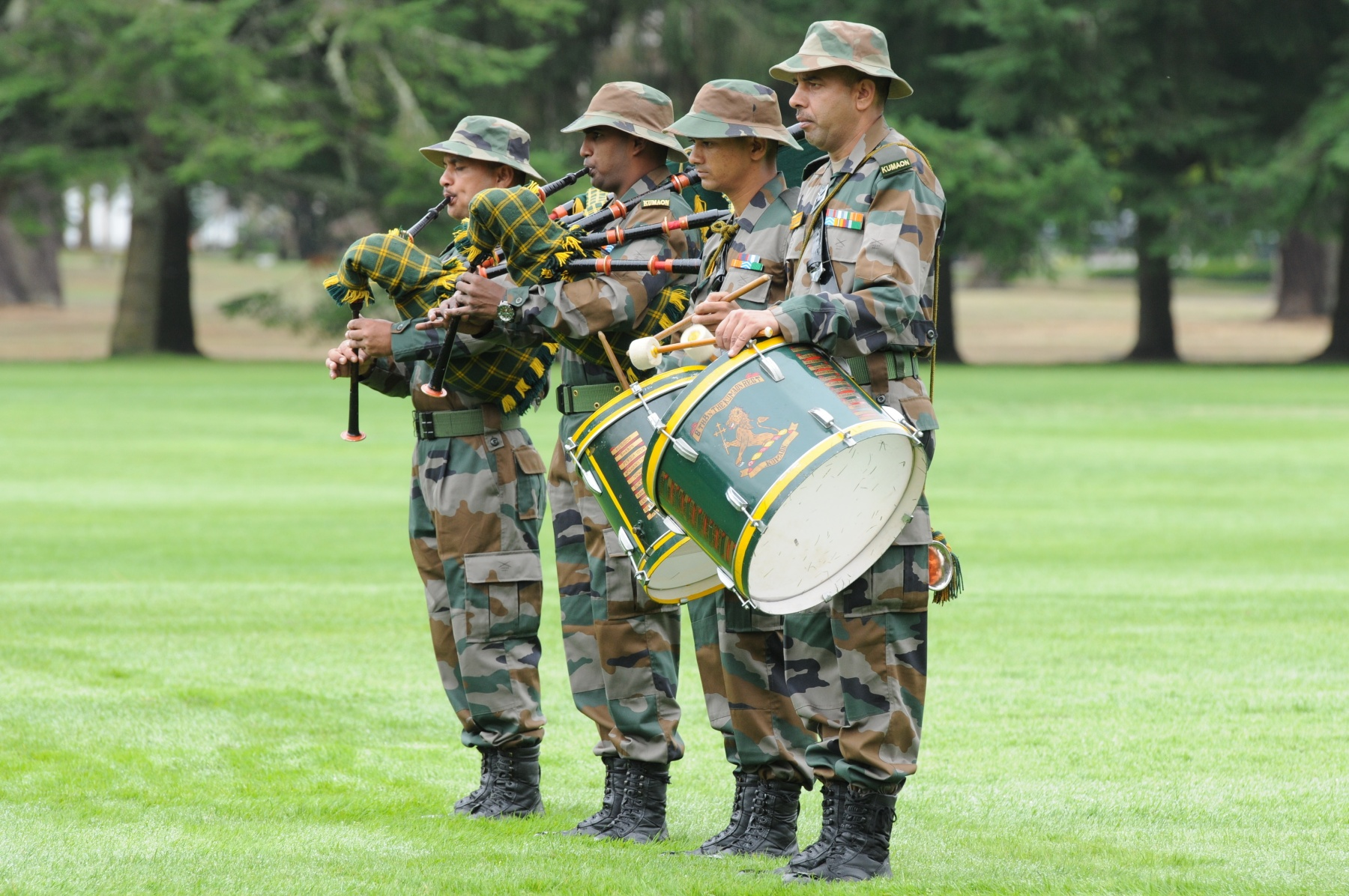
Members of the Kumaon Regiment Pipes and Drums during the opening ceremony of Yudh Abhyas in 2015

- Madras Regiment Pipes and Drums
- Punjab Regiment Pipes and Drums
- The Garhwal Rifles Pipes and Drums
- Pipes and Drums of Indian Army Gorkha Rifle Regiments
  - Pipes and Drums of 1st Gorkha Rifles
  - Pipes and Drums of 3rd Gorkha Rifles
  - Pipes and Drums of 5th Battalion, 4 Gorkha Rifles
  - Pipes and Drums of 5th Gorkha Rifles (Frontier Force)
  - Pipes and Drums of 11th Gorkha Rifles
- 14 Gorkha Training Centre Pipes and Drums
- Assam Regiment Pipes and Drums
- Dogra Regiment Pipes and Drums
- Sikh Regiment Pipes and Drums
- Rajputana Rifles Pipes and Drums
- Kumaon Regiment Pipes and Drums
- Ladakh Scouts Pipes and Drums
- Pipes and Drums of The Grenadiers
- Pipes and Drums of the Jammu and Kashmir Rifles
- Pipes and Drums of the 12th Assam Rifles

In December 2018, the British Band Instrument Company announced a new agreement with the Indian Army to supply all Regimental Centres with modern bagpipes and percussion instruments for their pipe bands. The new bagpipes were played for the first time on Republic Day 2019.

=== Youth cadet bands ===
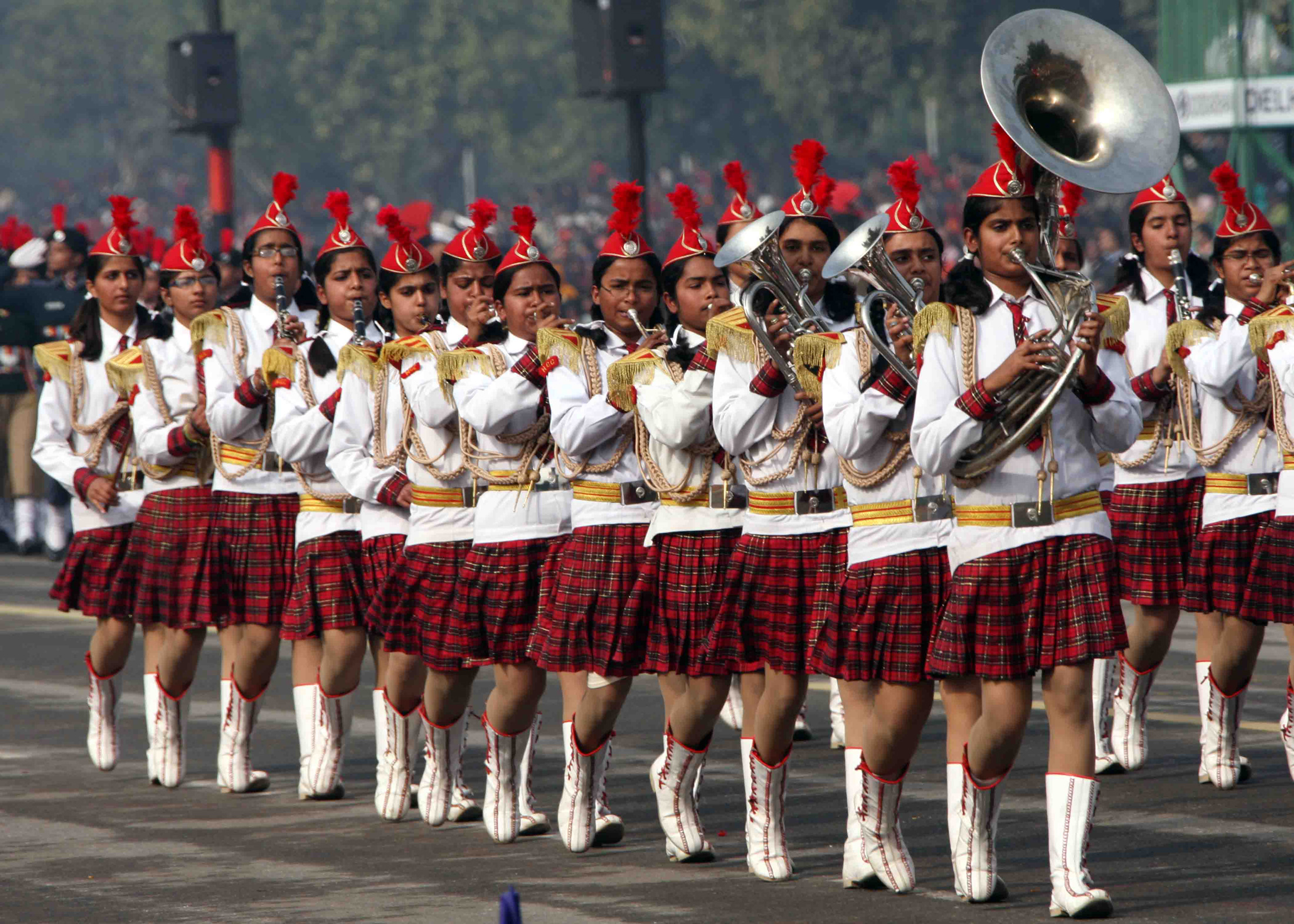
The Girls NCC Band from the Birla Balika Vidyapeeth school participating in a full dress rehearsal for the Republic Day Parade in 2011. The school band has had an annual participant in the RDC Parade since 1950.

The National Cadet Corps maintains two cadet bands: the Boys Band of the NCC and the Girls Band of the NCC. They are commonly formed up during the NCC Republic Day Camp in late January, during which the bands participate in the Republic Day Parade on 26 January and the Prime Minister's Rally on 28 January.

== Paramilitary bands ==
The following Indian paramilitary forces maintain military bands:

- Central Reserve Police Force Brass Band
- Central Industrial Security Force Band
- Border Security Force Brass Band
- Border Security Force Camel Band
- Band and Pipes and Drums of the Assam Rifles
- Other Assam Rifles Bands
- Indo-Tibetan Border Police Central Band
- Bihar Military Police Band
- Kolkata Armed Police Band

=== Central Reserve Police Force Brass Band ===
The Central Reserve Police Force Brass Band, which consists of 38 musicians, was raised in 1961. A pipe band was established earlier in the CRPF in 1952. At a large parade, the band can increase its size three-fold.

=== BSF Mounted Band ===
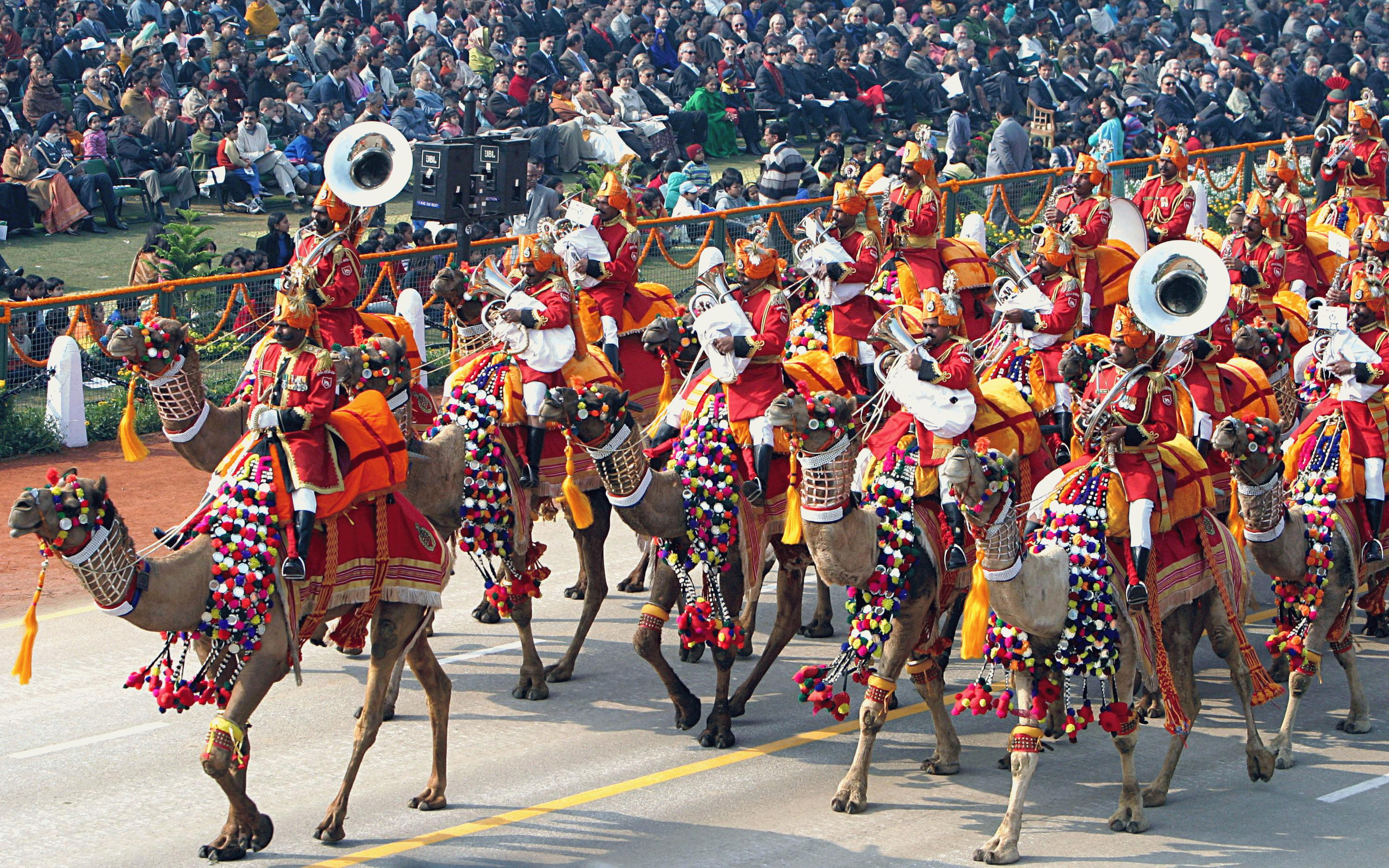
The unique BSF Camel Contingent during the annual Republic Day Parade in 2004

The 36-member camel mounted band of the Border Security Force is one of two official bands in the BSF. It is the only camel mounted military band in the world, and is mentioned in Guinness Book of World Records as such. It is one of the unique sights of the Delhi Republic Day parade and has been an annual participant since 1990. The only time it has missed a parade was in 2016 due to a lack of preparation.

=== Bands of the Assam Rifles ===
Different units of the Assam Rifles maintain battalion jazz and pipe bands. For example, the 12 Assam Rifles has a pipe band that was raised in Wokha in 1959. In 2011, the 43 Assam Rifles began its own jazz band in a remote village in Senapati as a means to bring music to the people of that area. Brass bands are maintained at the Assam Rifles Training Centre and School.

With the sanction of the Commandant of the Assam Rifles, bands can engage in events hosted by private entities. The band of a unit is managed by a committee of three officers that are appointed quarterly. When massed bands are on parade, the senior bandmaster normally conducts (with the exception of the parade commander changing him/her at their discretion). All bands are provided with copies of Jana Gana Mana and all regimental marches in the Assam Rifles. As a matter of tradition, all bands adhere to high pitch when performing.

=== Indo-Tibetan Border Police Band ===
The Indo-Tibetan Border Police Brass Band was raised in 1973 and has been participating in Republic Day Parade annually since 1977. It has won best marching contingent in parade during the year 1998, 1999, 2000, 2004 and 2011 by marching on brass band tunes.

== Events ==
=== Republic Day parade ===
Indian military bands play an active role in the annual Delhi Republic Day parade on the Rajpath. It is the largest and central of the parades marking the Republic Day celebrations in India. The bands of nine to twelve different Army regiments, as well as bands from the Navy and the Air Force march in the parade. Sub Lieutenant Ramesh Chand Katoch has set a record for leading a band contingent on the Rajpath the most, leading the Navy Band in 20 out 30 consecutive parades.

=== Beating Retreat ===
The Beating Retreat is a massive gathering of Indian military bands held on Republic Day in the capital of New Delhi. It is organized by Section D of the Ministry of Defence. It is based on a 16th-century military ceremony in England that was first used to recall nearby patrolling units to their castle. The ceremony happens at Vijay Chowk, and involves Indian military bands as well as the bands of the paramilitary services and the Delhi Police Band. Brass bands, pipes bands, and buglers from various Army Regiments perform at the ceremony. National and religious pieces such as Abide With Me, Sare Jahan se Accha and sunset. The ceremony achieved a Guinness World Record mention for being the largest military band under one conductor, with its rendition of Amazing Grace including 4,459 musicians.

=== Independence Day ===
Military bands perform on Independence Day during the ceremony at the historical site of Red Fort in Delhi.

=== Changing of the Guard ===
A ceremonial changing of the guard is held at the President of India's residence, the Rashtrapati Bhavan. It is held with the participation of supporting Indian military bands as well as President's Body Guard and the Brigade of the Guards. As the sentries are nominated and inspected by their officers, the band plays 'Sammaan Guard' (The Honour Guard) as a slow march before following that up with a formal march into the forecourt of the palace with the band playing "Sher-E-Jawan" (Tiger of a soldier). Other notable protocol tunes played at the ceremony include "Robinson" and "Sare Jahan Se Accha" (Better than any nation). Once they assume charge, the New Guard marches off along with the band playing "Amar Jawan" (Immortal Soldier).

=== Military Band Concert ===
The Military Band Concert is an annual event that is part of the Vijay Diwas celebrations organized to commemorate the victory in the Indo-Pakistani War of 1971 and the Bangladesh Liberation War. Apart from marching tunes, Bengali and Bangladeshi songs are also performed by band members.

=== Passing out parades ===
Bands commonly perform at Passing out parades for military cadets. Throughout the Commonwealth of Nations, the traditions for these ceremonies are the same, Auld Lang Syne by Robert Burns often being played. At the Indian Military Academy, before the cadets begin the passing out parade ceremony, the band plays a melody (aarti), allowing the cadets to pray to their respective god.

=== Foreign tattoos and parades ===
In July 2009, Indian military bands marched down the Champs-Élysées with contingents from their respective services during the Bastille Day military parade to the sound of the military bands playing Indian martial tunes including Sare Jahan Se Accha, Haste Lushai and Qadam Qadam Badhaye Ja. The same band took part in the Royal Edinburgh Military Tattoo and the Spasskaya Tower Military Music Festival and Tattoo in 2017. In December 2019, for the first time, an Indian Army Band took part in the Victory day of Bangladesh parade.

== Notable military music personnel ==
- Lieutenant Colonel Girish Kumar Unnikrishnan, Director of Music of the Tri-Services Band in Moscow
- Warrant Officer 2nd rank Suresh Kumar, director of the Indian Army Chief's Band from 1988
- Captain S.S. Nagra, former Inspector of Army Bands
- Harold Joseph, former music director of the Indian Army
- Jerome Rodrigues, LMME LTCL former music director of the Indian Navy
- Commander Sebastian Anchees, former music director of the Indian Navy
- Major Nazir Hussain, was the Advisor in Military Music at the Army Headquarters from 1997 to 2004
- Major Karun Khanna, director of the Beating Retreat from 1974 to 1976
- Warrant Officer Ashok Kumar, Band Master of the IAF Band since 2008
- J.N. Roy Choudhary, instructor of music at the Military Music Wing and composer of Deshon Ka Sartaj Bharat
- M.S. Neer, VSM, LMME-LTCL, Former music director, Indian Navy
- L.B. Gurung
- Nirmal Chandra Vij
- Master Chief Petty Officer 1st Class and Honorary Lieutenant Ramesh Chand Katoch, Band Master of the Indian Navy Band until 2018
- Master Chief Petty Officer 2nd Class and Honorary Sub-Lieutenant Vincent Johnson, Band Master of the Indian Navy Band (2018 to 2023)
- Master Chief Petty Officer 2nd Class M. Anthony Raj, Band Master of the Indian Navy Band (since 2023)
- Commander Vijay Charles D'Cruz, current Director of Music of the Indian Navy
- Wing Commander Gopalakrishnan Jayachandran, current Director of Music and Principal Conductor for No. 1 Air Force Band

== Marches ==
The band performs a number of slow and quick marches such as:

- Sare Jahan se Accha (Patriotic March)
- Qadam Qadam Badhaye Ja (Army Quick March)
- Samman Guard (Army Slow March)
- Desh Pukare Jab Sab Ko (Air Force Quick March)
- Vayu Sena Nishaan (Air Force Slow March)
- Jai Bharati (Navy Quick March)
- Anand Lok (Navy Slow March)
- Vande Mataram
- Deshon Ka Sartaj Bharat
- General Salute
- Naval Ensign
- Sea Lord
- Indian Fleet
- Voice of the Guns
- Have the NCC Spirit in You
- Bravo Warriors
- Flying Star
- Battle of the Sky
- Stride
- Gulmarg
- Benihaal
- Nirmaljit
- Amar Senani (The Immortal Soldier)
- Dhwaj Ka Rakshak (Defenders of the Flag)
- Uthari Seemaye (The Northern Frontiers)
- Suvruth (The Holy Oath)
- Vijayi Bharath (India, the Victorious)
- Hind Maha Sagar (The mighty Indian Ocean)
- Nabh Rakshak (Defenders of the Air)
- Antariksh Baan (Arrow in the Air)
- Dhwani Avrodh (Sound Barrier)
- Siki Amole (Precious Coins)

== Gallery ==
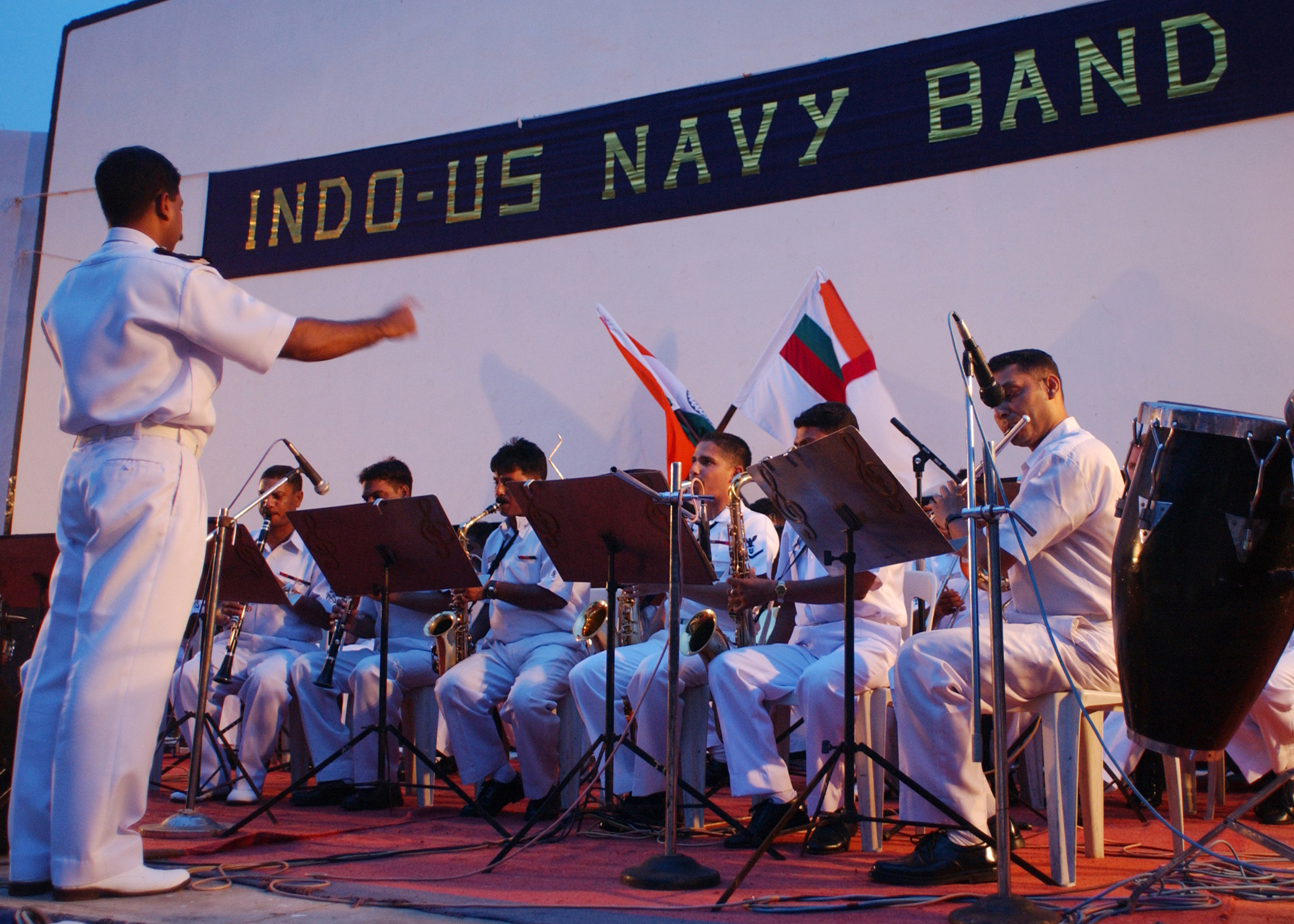

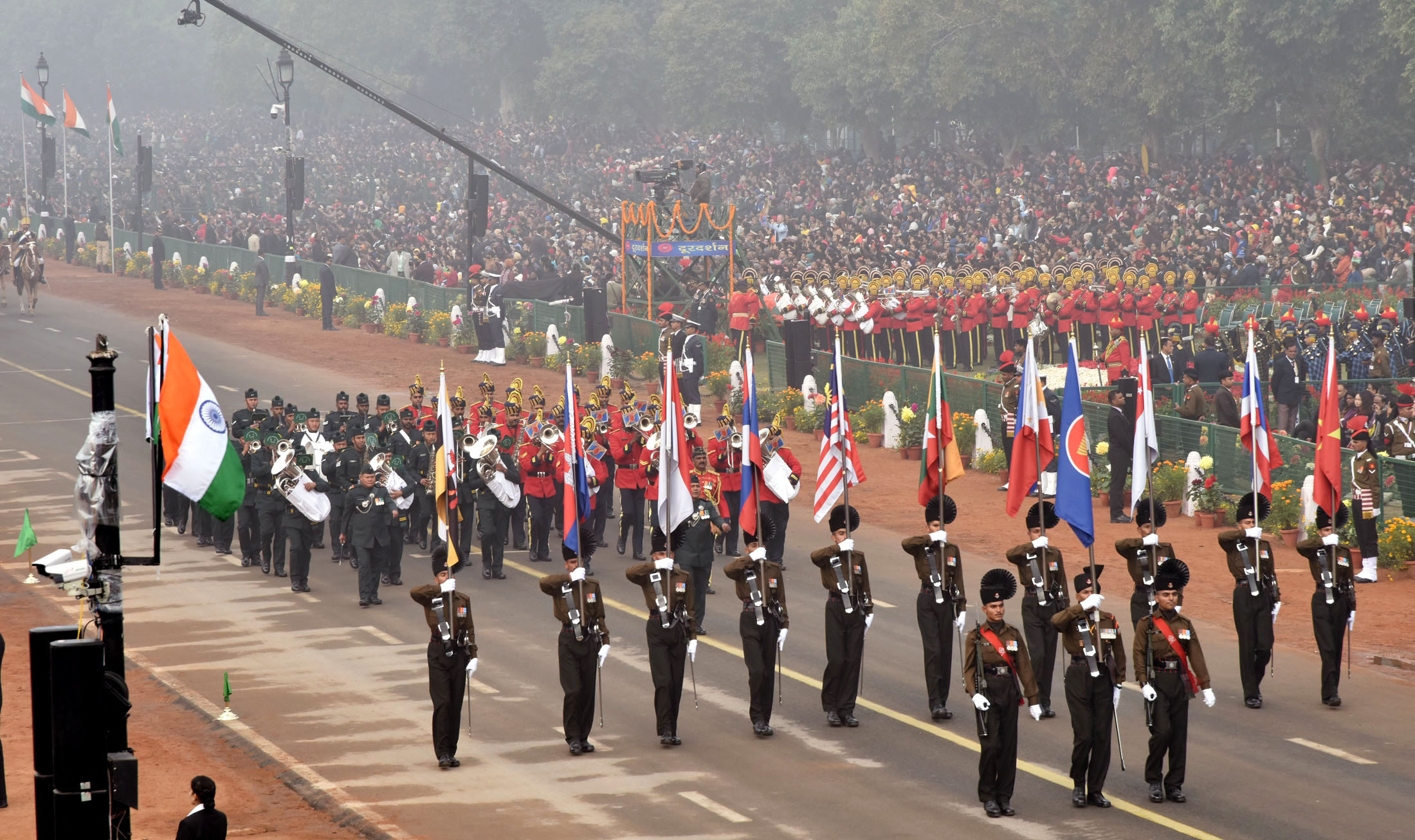
Indian Army bands marching behind an ASEAN flag bearer contingent through the Rajpath

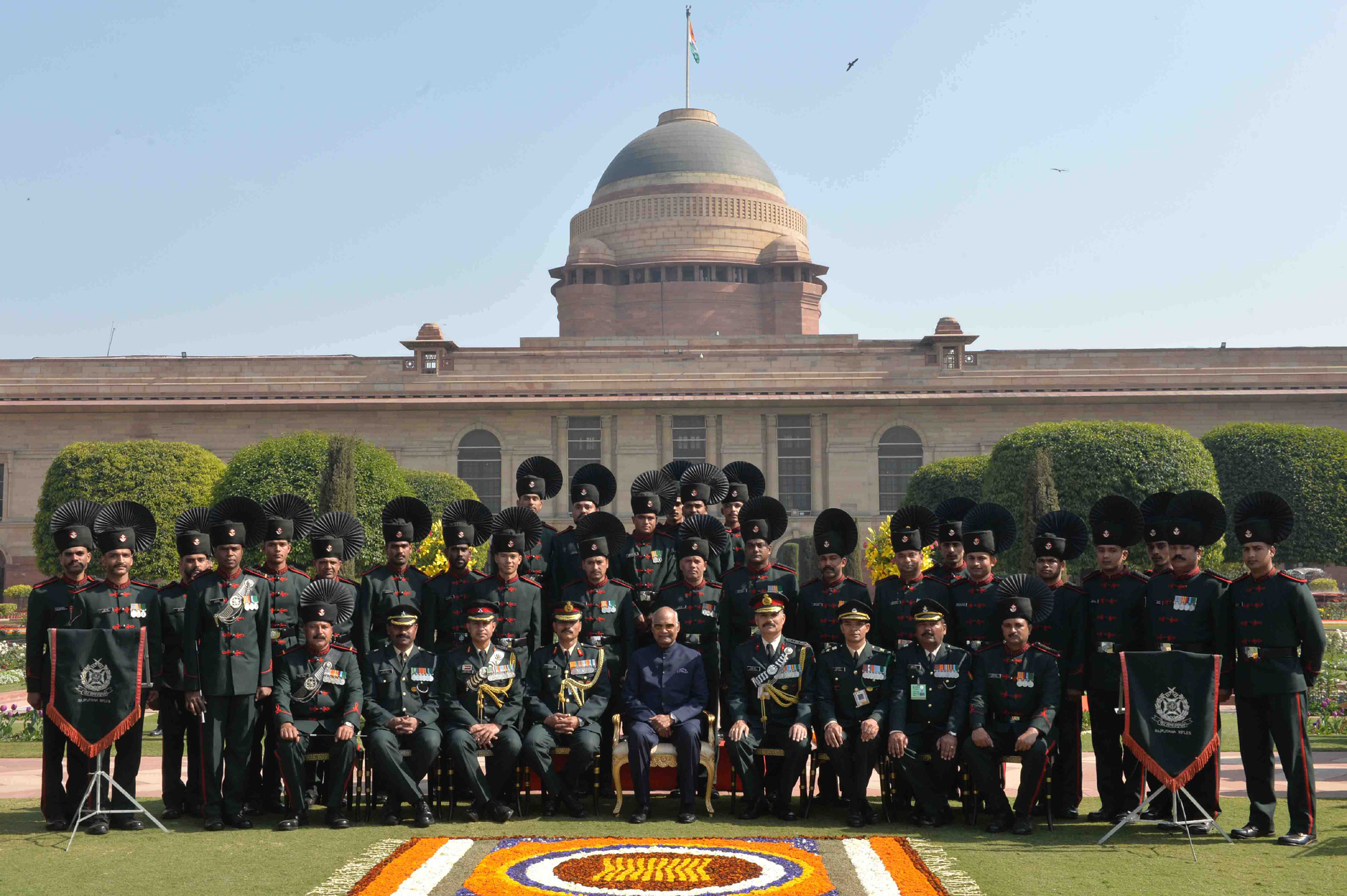
Members of the Band of the Rajputana Rifles

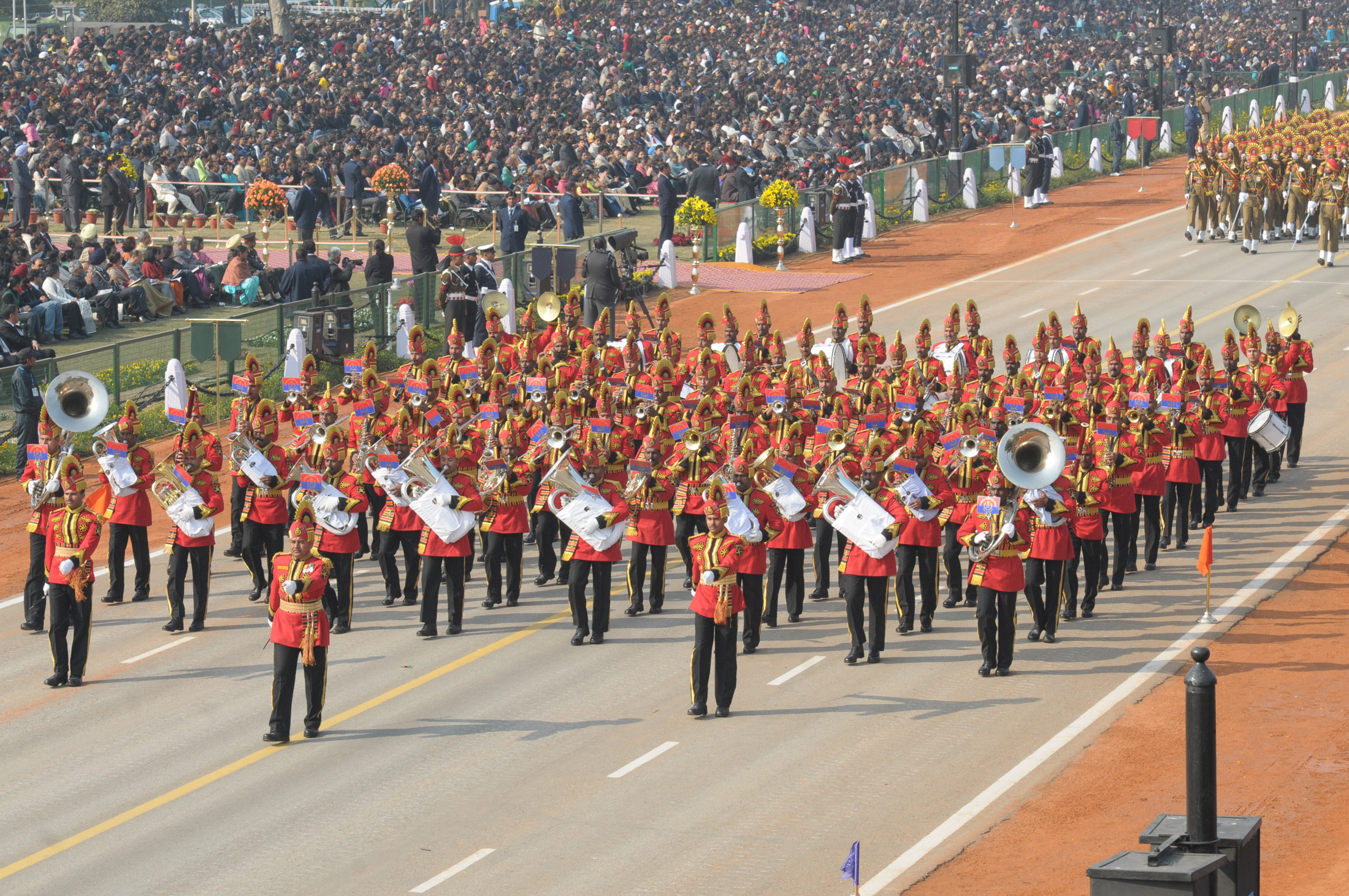
BSF band marching contingent during the 63rd Republic Day Parade

== See also ==
India related

- Band of the Brigade of Gurkhas
- Beating retreat in India
- Deshon Ka Sartaj Bharat
- Indian Army Chief's Band
- Military Music Wing
- Music of India
- President's Bodyguard
- Tri-Services Guard of Honour (India)
- Samman Guard
- Guard of honour

Other related topics

- Sri Lankan military bands
- Royal Corps of Army Music
- United States military bands
- Russian military bands

== Videos ==
- Tri Services Band Concert
- The Band Spasskaya Tower in 2009
- Indian Air Force band performs at Beating Retreat ceremony in Delhi
- Military music is alive and flourishing in the Indian armed forces!
