= Officers Training Academy Band =

The Officers Training Academy Military Band is a musical unit in the Indian Armed Forces based in Chennai. The band was established in 1973 from an amalgamation of musicians from various regiments in the Indian Army. The band has since been involved in boosting the morale and supporting officer cadets during their training at OTA. It has participated in passing out parades, symphonic concerts and national military parades. It also performs locally in neighborhoods such as St. Thomas Mount.

The band is composed of three sections: woodwind, brass and percussion. There is also a piper group, a resident vocalist and a jazz band. It consists of 34 musicians, many of whom are cadets at the OTA. Its training schedule is six hours of training per day for two months before a major concert or parade. It is currently led by Subedar Major Afzal Khan.

== See also ==
- Indian Army Chief's Band
- United States Military Academy Band
