= Band of the Brigade of Gurkhas =

British military band

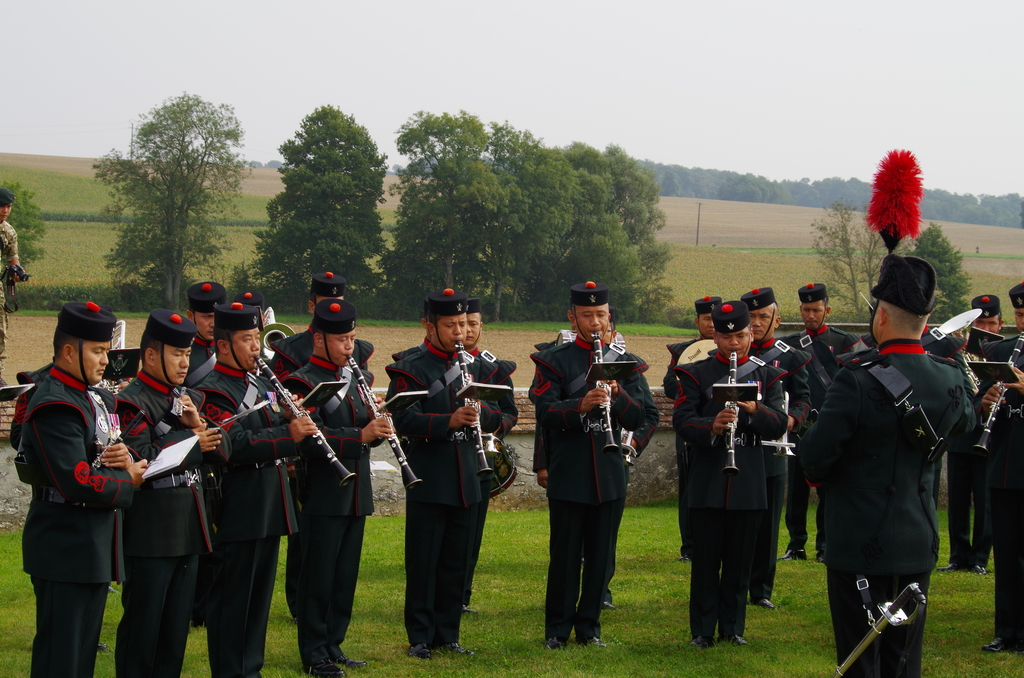
The Band of the Brigade of Gurkhas performing in France, 2014.

The Band of the Brigade of Gurkhas is a British military band based at Shorncliffe. It supports the British Army and the Brigade of Gurkhas in ceremonial settings, pass off parades, concerts and many other musical support tasks. It is a directly reporting unit of Regional Bands HQ (RBANDS) under London District, which sponsors the promotion of British military music. It is one of two 'Light Pace' regular wind bands in the British Army. (the other being the Band and Bugles of The Rifles). The band has travelled extensively since its inception, travelling more recently to The Falkland Islands, Australia, Brunei, Canada, France, Germany, Nepal, Belgium. Today, musicians from Nepal are chosen during their Gurkha military training. Their musical instruction commences first under Director of Music (DOM) and then under supervision of the Royal Military School of Music.

== History ==
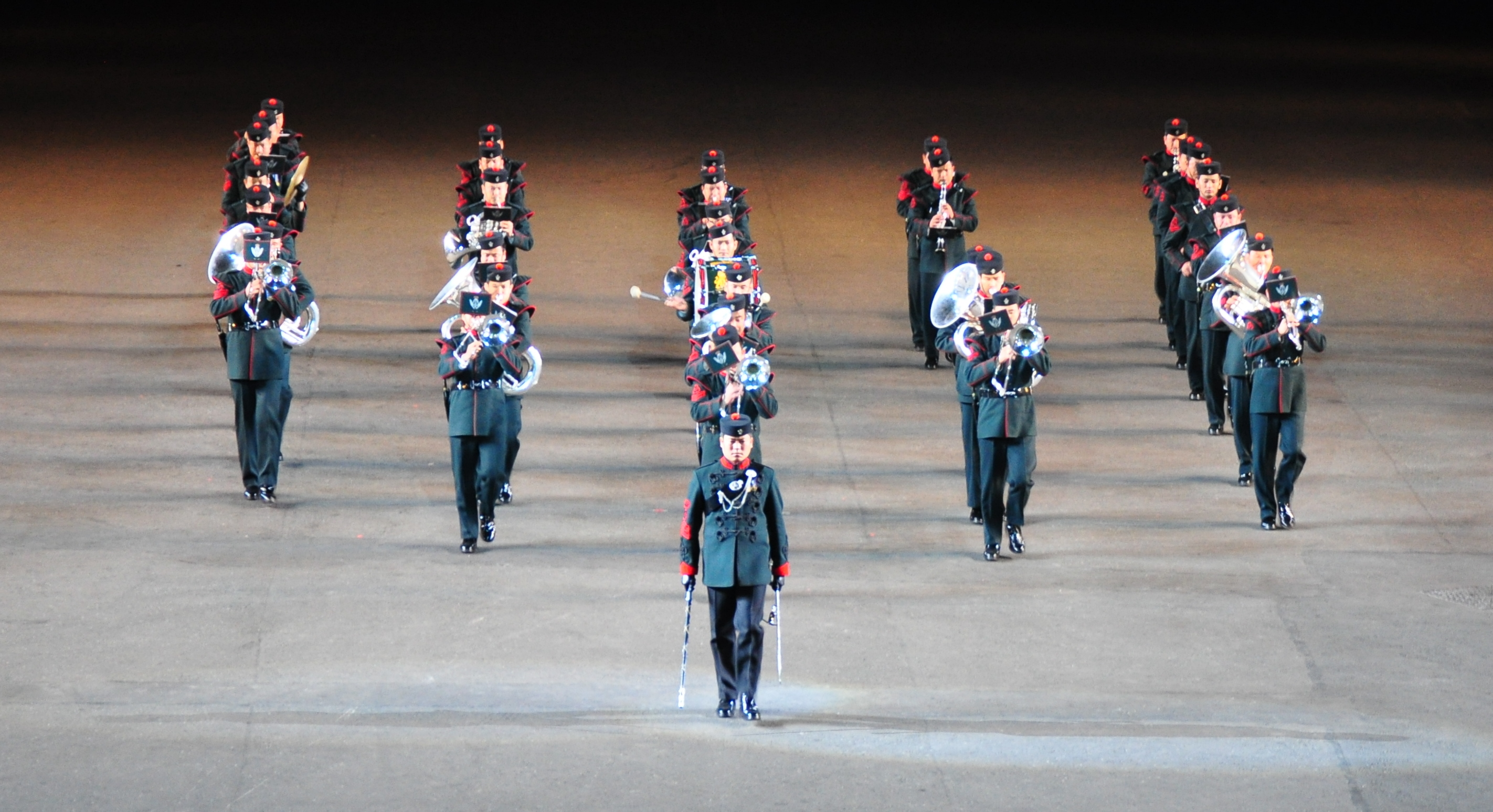
The band during the Royal Edinburgh Military Tattoo in 2010.

The band was raised in November 1859 as part the Sirmoor Rifle Regiment, originally consisting of 16 Bandsmen and one with the rank of Naik who served as bandmaster. Certain changes in 1886 (such as the raising of a new 2nd Battalion) allowed for an expansion of the existing band. The two bands often cooperated with each other in both of their musical and operational duties (bandsmen also served as stretcher bearers and medical personnel on the battlefield). The army sanctioned the training of a new band in 1949, with 56 recruits beginning their army service. Within a year of that decision, a brigade staff band was established, leaving the unit with two separate military bands. At the time, ad hoc instruction and education was given by British bandmasters and acclaimed musicians of working for the army, which would end in May 1951. The two bands routine continued for over a decade until the two bands were amalgamated because of financial considerations. Although they served as a combined band, the two bands remained separately in the United Kingdom and Hong Kong to support their respective battalions in the 70s and 80s, until the 2nd Battalion initiated their withdraw from the region in 1994.

== Pipe band ==
The 1st and 2nd Battalions, Royal Gurkha Rifles currently maintain pipe bands as part of the band.

The Queen's Own Gurkha Logistic Regiment also maintains a pipes and drums.

== Sounding Retreat ==
Sounding Retreat is a variant of the traditional Beating Retreat done by Massed Bands of the Household Division. Today, the ceremony is almost exclusively performed by Band of the Brigade of Gurkhas, alongside their counterparts in the former Massed Bands of the Light Division. Aside from the band, the Band and Bugles of The Rifles and the Light Division Buglers Association have performed the Sounding Retreat on Horse Guards Parade on 31 May since 1993.

== Other events ==
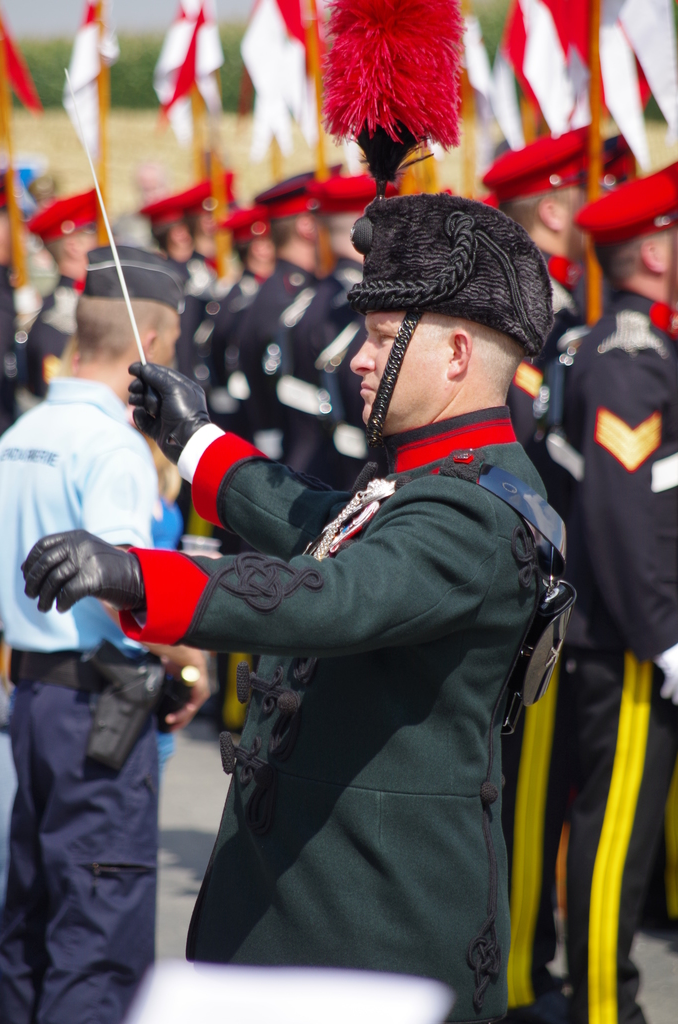
The Director of Music of the Band of the Brigade of Gurkhas.

- At the dedication ceremony to a Francis Tuker memorial tablet at Brighton College, the band performed a Beating Retreat ceremony on the school's playing field.
- The band performs at the 2009 Royal Bath and West Show.
- The band performs at the pre-game of the 2015 FA Cup Final at Wembley Stadium in London.
- Took part in the changing of the Queen's Guard at Buckingham Palace in May 2015.
- The band provide ceremonial entertainment during the Royal Norfolk Show in 2014.
- The band, alongside members of the entire brigade, took part in a visits to Nepal as part of brigade's 200th anniversary celebrations in 2015. During the visit, the band performed for schoolchildren at The British School, Kathmandu.
- A 200th anniversary pageant in June 2015 was held at the Royal Hospital Chelsea in London, which featured the Band of the Brigade of Gurkhas.

== See also ==
India related

- Beating retreat in India
- Deshon Ka Sartaj Bharat
- Indian military bands
- Indian Army Chief's Band
- Military Music Wing
- Music of India
- President's Bodyguard
- Tri-Services Guard of Honour (India)
- Samman Guard

Other related

- Guard of honour
- Band and Bugles of The Rifles
- Gurkha Contingent Pipes and Drums Platoon
