= Tri-Services Guard of Honour (India) =

Honour guard of the Indian Armed Forces

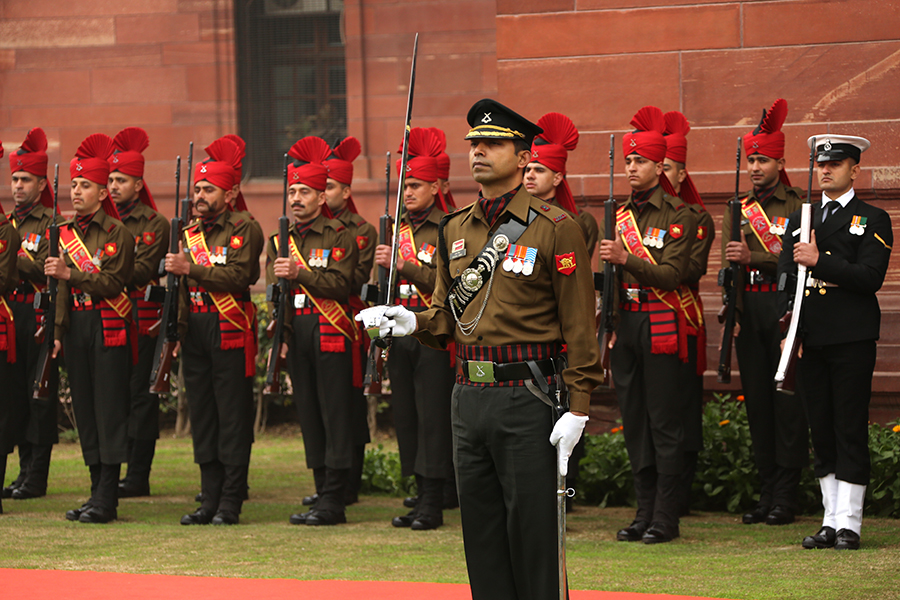
The commander of the company.

The Tri-Services Guard of Honour is an ad hoc infantry company of the Indian Armed Forces which is responsible for providing guards of honour for high ranking Indian and foreign officials. The company was created shortly after India gained its independence from the United Kingdom in 1947. It is headquartered in New Delhi and is composed of 100 men and women who are drawn from the three services of the Indian armed forces, the army, the navy and the air force. The guard excludes the Indian Coast Guard in any of its protocol events.

The company is deployed to the Rashtrapati Bhavan or the Secretariat Building only during the visits of Presidents, Prime Ministers, and Defense Ministers to India. Samman Guard is the march played by Indian military bands during inspections of guards of honour during state visits. On 25 January 2015, during President Barack Obama's state visit to India, Wing Commander Pooja Thakur made history by becoming the first female officer to lead the company during an arrival ceremony. It took part in the 2020 Moscow Victory Day Parade on Red Square.

Outside of India, a tri-services guard of honour may refer to an honour guard that includes the three main service branches of that country's military.

== Gallery ==
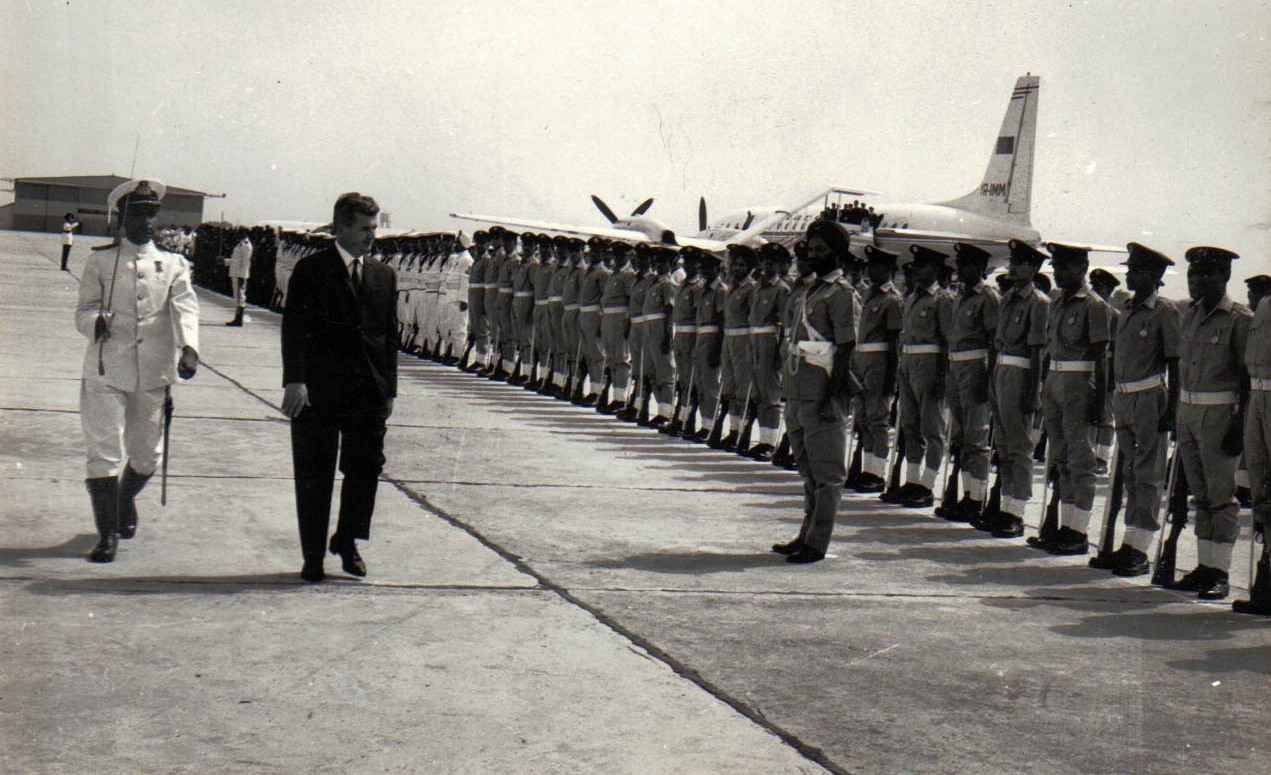
Nicolae Ceauşescu reviewing the company in October 1969.

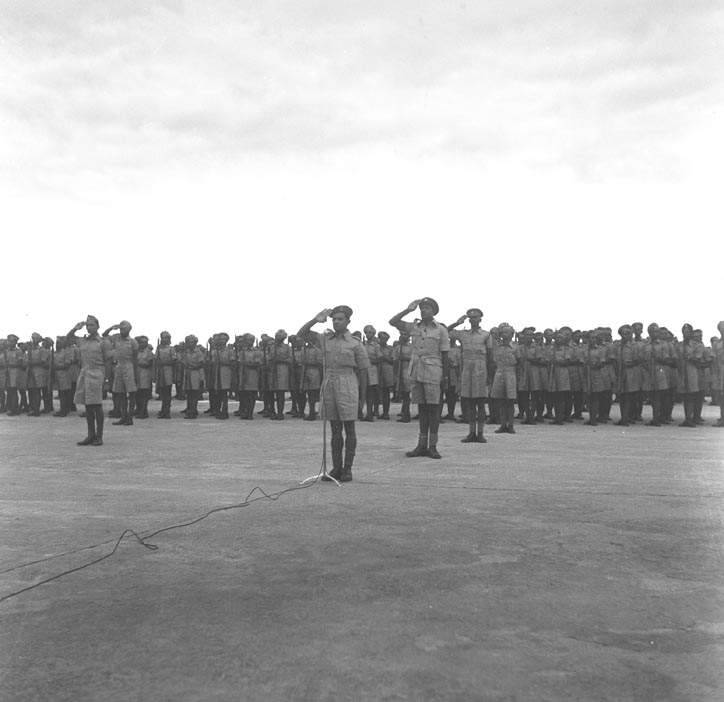
A guard of honour for Vallabhbhai Patel in Nagpur.

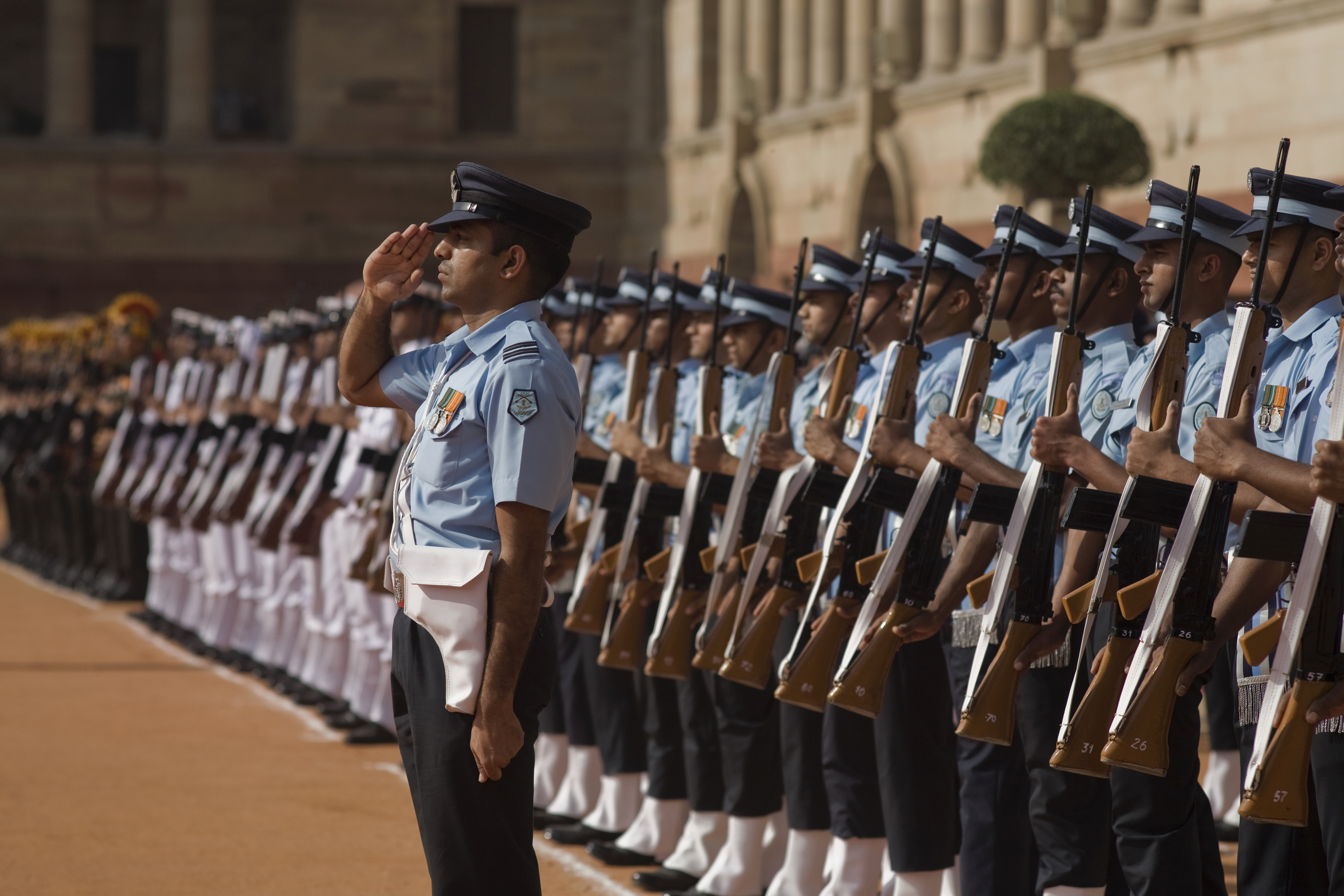
A member of the Tri-Services Guard of Honour from the Indian Air Force.

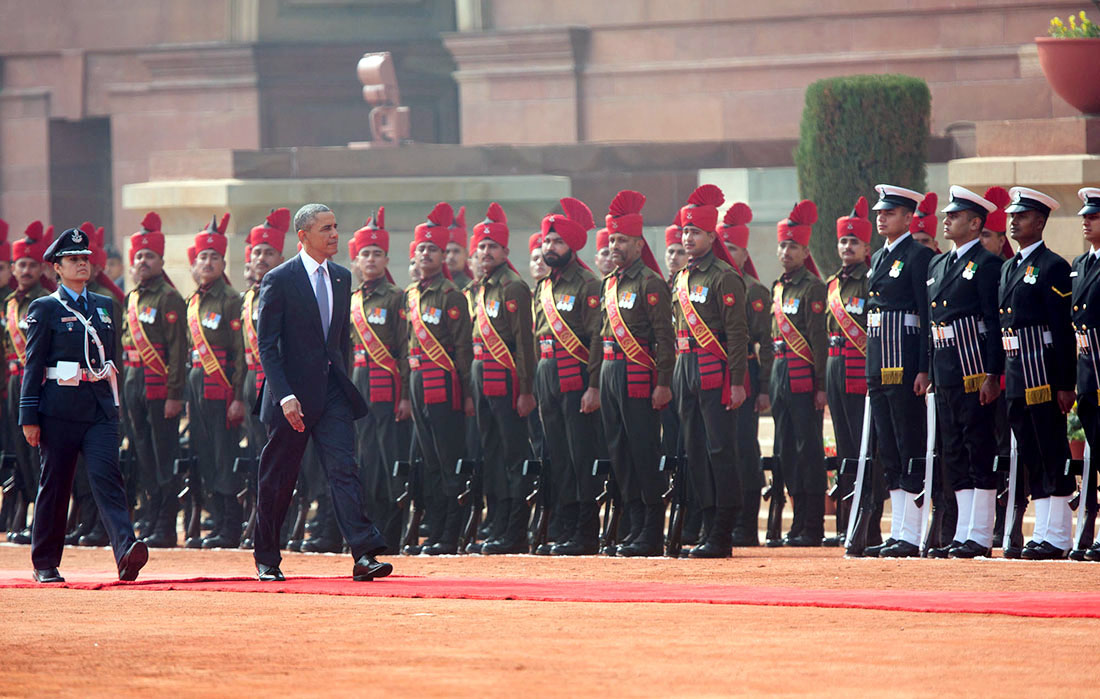
U.S. President Barack Obama inspecting the company with Pooja Thakur in 2015.

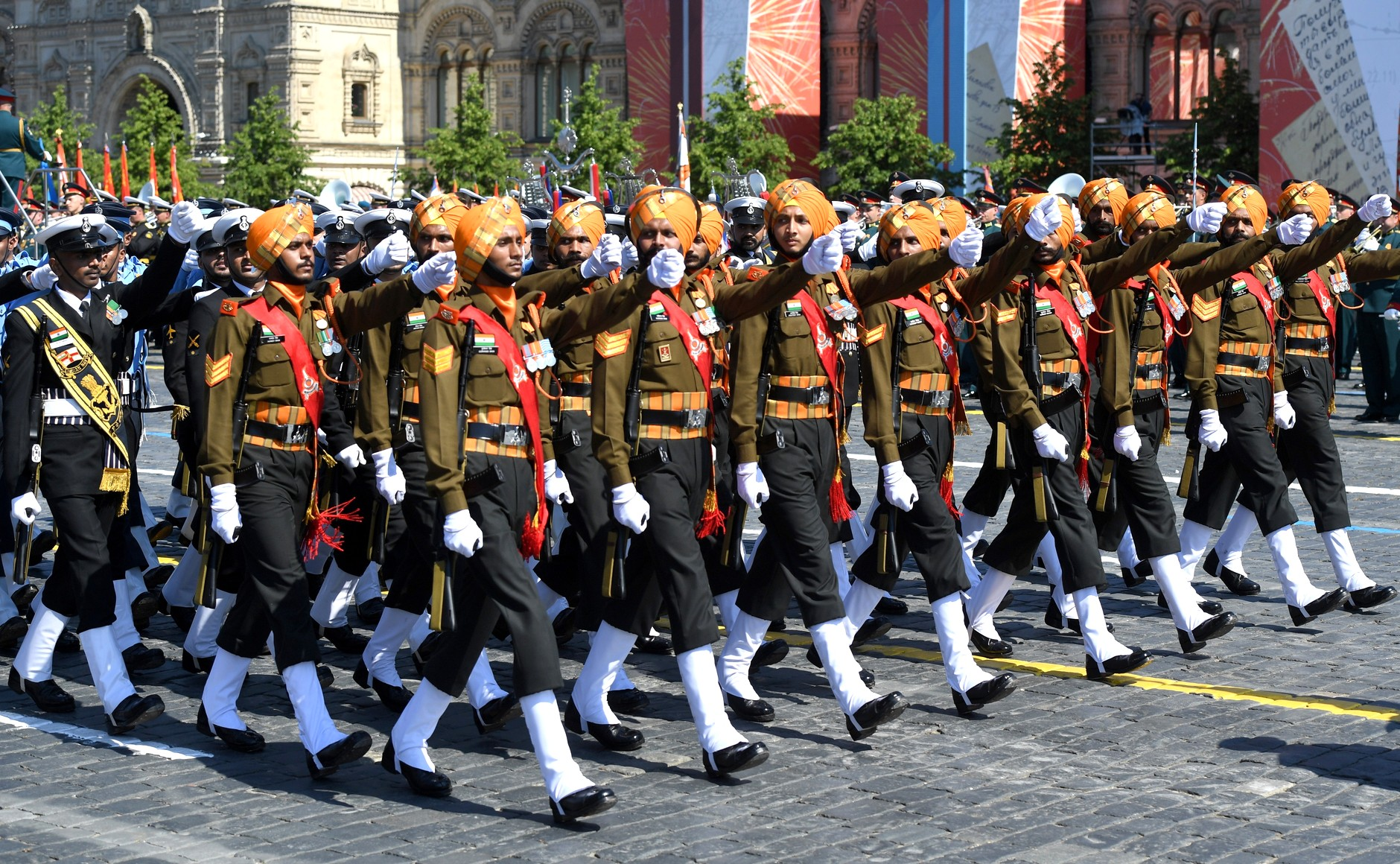
Members of the Tri-Service Guard of Honour on Red Square during the 2020 Moscow Victory Day Parade.

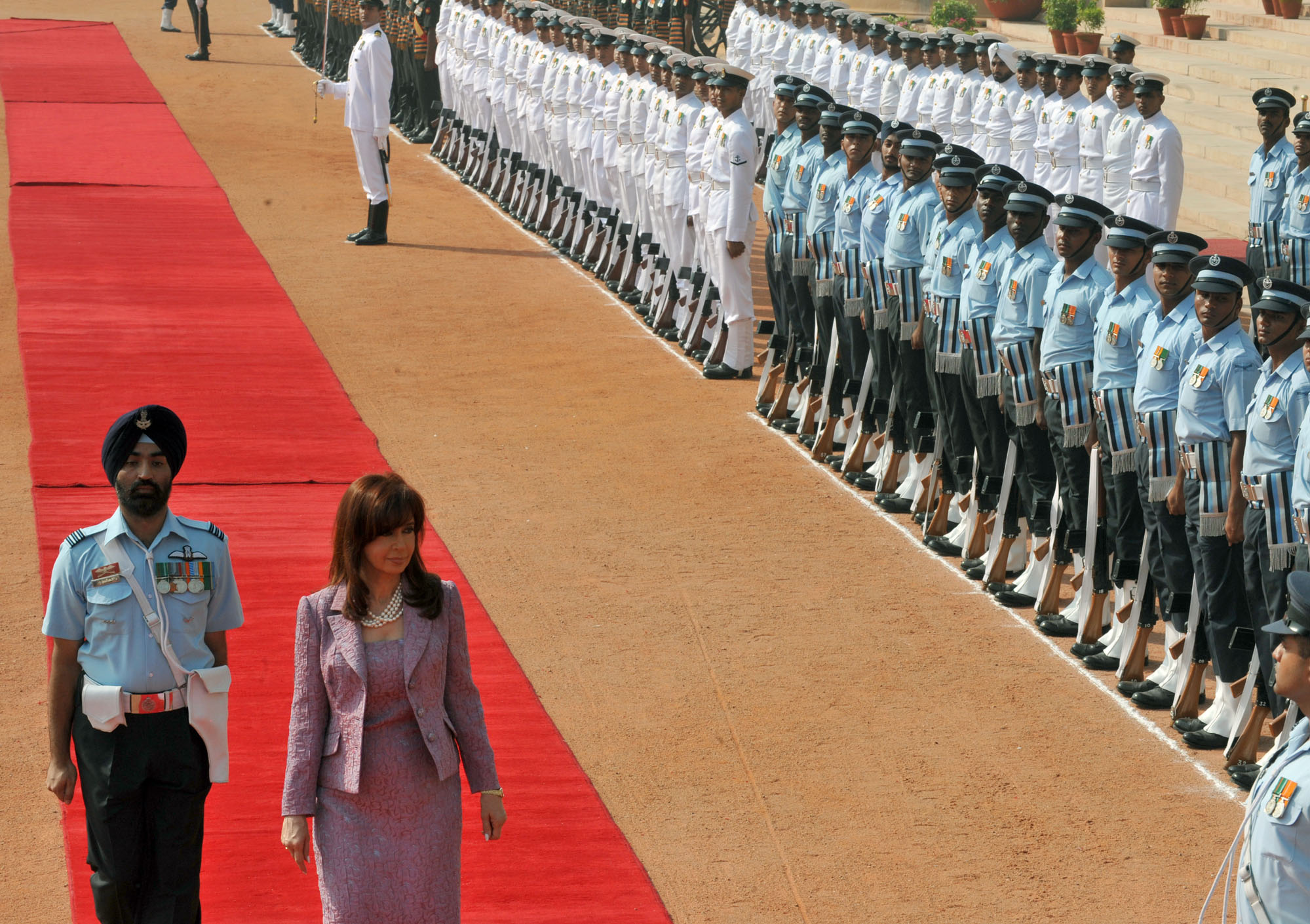
Argentinian President Cristina Fernández de Kirchner receiving guard of honour in 2009.

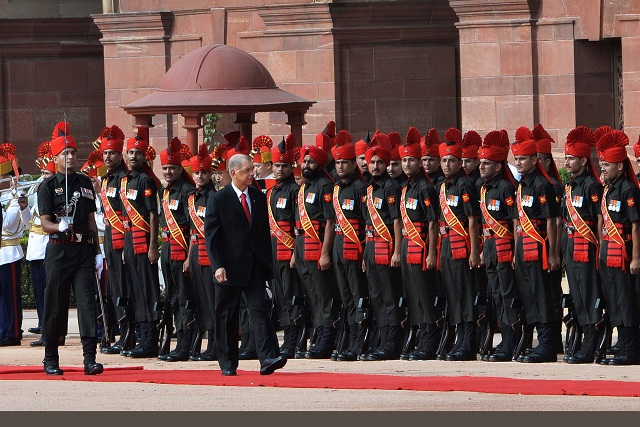
Seychelles President James Michel receiving a guard of honour.

== See also ==
India related

- Band of the Brigade of Gurkhas
- Beating retreat in India
- Deshon Ka Sartaj Bharat
- Indian military bands
- Indian Army Chief's Band
- Military Music Wing
- Music of India
- President's Bodyguard
- Samman Guard

Other related

- Guard of honour
