= Military Music Wing =

Music school of the Indian Armed Forces

The Military Music Wing of the Army Education Corps is an educational institution that supports the Indian Army and all military bands and musicians in its ranks. Being part of the AEC, its facilities are located in Pachmarhi, Madhya Pradesh state. After gaining independence in 1947, there became a need to establish an Indian institution of military music to give a new direction and dimension to the music of the Indian Armed Forces. There were thoughts of creating as school of music that was based on the Royal Military School of Music in the British Royal Corps of Army Music. The inspiration for this action came from the then Advisor of Military Music at the Army Headquarters in New Delhi. This project came into fruition on 23 October 1950 under the patronage and supervision of K. M. Cariappa, the-then first Indian C-in-C of the Army.

== Tasks ==
This establishment has been tasked to do the following activities:

- Train bandmasters and music instructors in band instruments for the Indian Army.
- Training musicians from the bands of three services and paramilitary forces of the country.
- Training musicians from foreign countries such as Sri Lanka, Nepal, Bhutan, Afghanistan, Kenya and Mauritius among other countries.

== See also ==
India related

- Band of the Brigade of Gurkhas
- Beating retreat in India
- Deshon Ka Sartaj Bharat
- Indian military bands
- Indian Army Chief's Band
- Music of India
- Tri-Services Guard of Honour (India)
- Samman Guard

Other related topics

- Canadian Forces School of Music
- Moscow Military Music College
- United States Armed Forces School of Music
- Guard of honour
