= Indian Air Force Band =

No. 1 Air Force Band
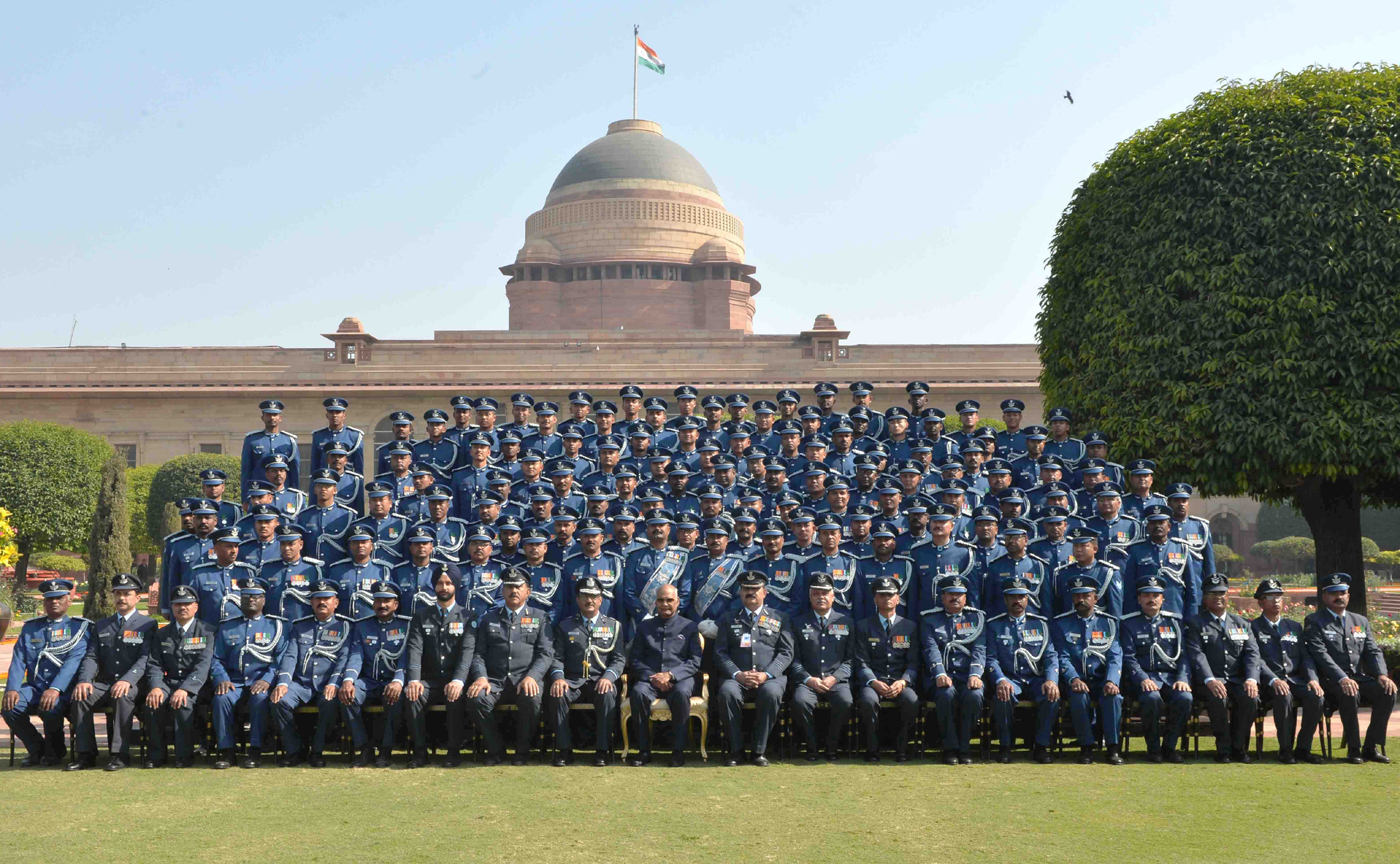
- President Ram Nath Kovind with members of the band following the Republic Day Beating Retreat, 30 January 2018.
- Active: 1944; 82 years ago
- Country: India
- Branch: Indian Air Force
- Size: 35
- Part of: Directorate of Organisation
- Garrison/HQ: Jalahalli

Commanders
- Current commander: Squadron Leader Lamapokpam Roopchand Singh
- Notable commanders: • Wg Cdr Gopalakrishnan Jayachandran • Master Warrant Officer J.A. George VSM • HFO Warrant Officer Ashok Kumar VSM • Sgt Charles Antony Daniel

The Indian Air Force Band, known officially as No. 1 Air Force Band is a full-time military band of the Indian Air Force. It is considered to be the primary musical unit of the IAF, currently stationed in Jalahalli. Outside the symphony orchestra, other military ensembles have included the following: parade band, jazz ensemble, and vocalist group. It falls under the command of the Directorate of Organisation of the IAF.

== History ==
It was the first Indian air force band to be formed, being established on 10 June 1944 under the name of the RIAF Central Band. It was based in Kohat and consisted of one officer accompanied by 47 airmen. Its composition was order by Wing Commander G.R. Bowler, the then Under Secretary at the War Department of British India. It gave its first performance at a military parade in Ambala on 13 February 1946. After the Independence of India occurred, it came to Jalahalli in Bangalore in 1947. In 2005, the band became the first Asian member of the International Military Music Society based in Norway.

== Air Warriors Symphony Orchestra ==
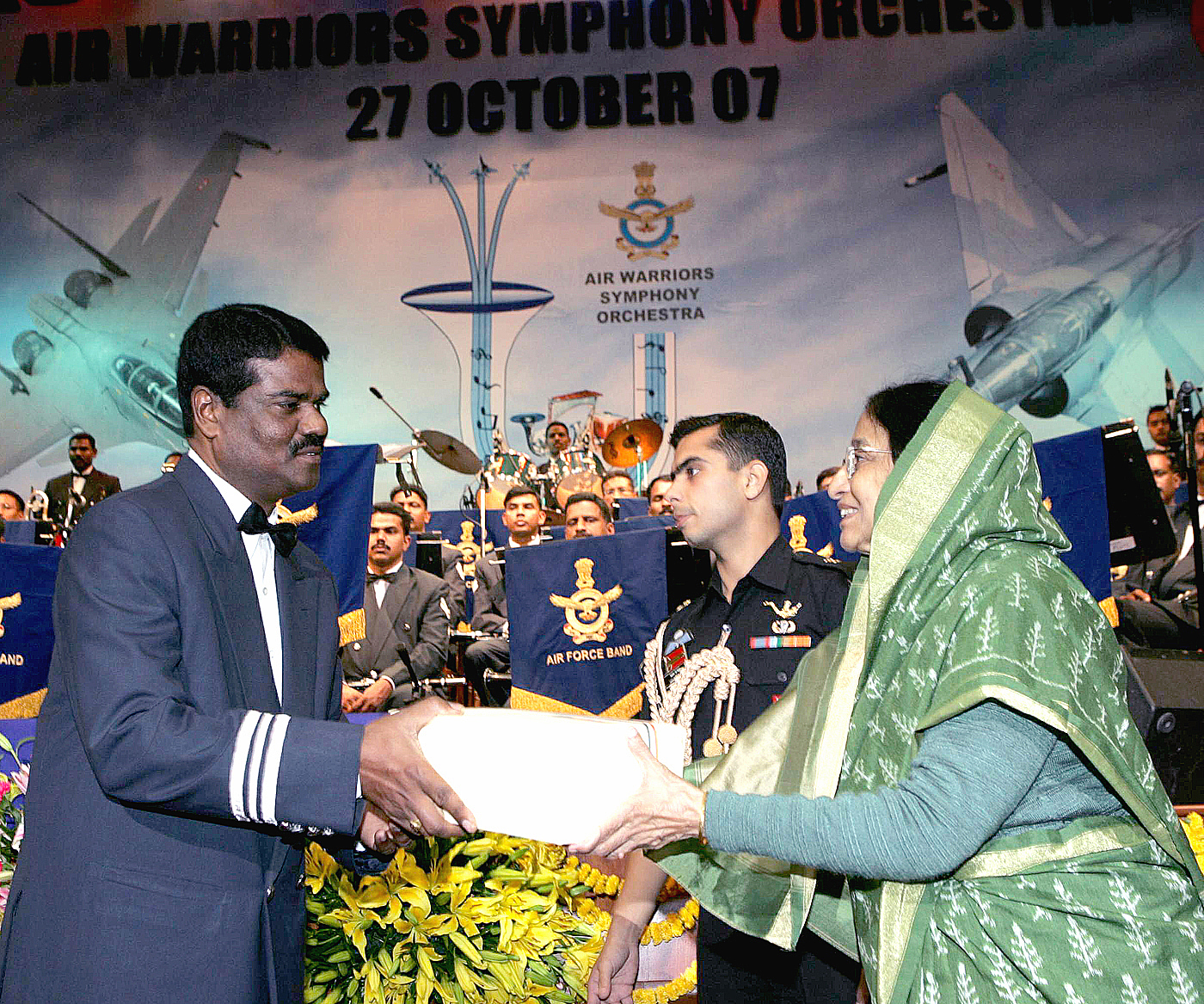
President Pratibha Patil presenting a memento to the conductor of the AWSO in the auditorium of the Rashtrapati Bhavan.

The Air Warrior Symphony Orchestra (AWSO) is the concert band unit of the IAF Band. Formed in June 2002, the AWSO consists of hand-picked musicians from the seven IAF Bands across the country. The AWSO has performed at many concerts across the world in countries like France, Italy, Germany, Malaysia, Singapore, and Bangladesh as well as at venues such as India Gate and Vijay Chowk. It also has taken part in domestic events such as the IAF Platinum Jubilee Tattoo in March 2007. In 2014, the AWSO, under the direction of Squadron Leader Gopalakrishnan Jayachandran, engaged in a joint performance with the Central Band of the Royal Air Force. 5 years later in 2019, the band performed for the first time with the visiting United States Air Force Band of the Pacific. In 2007, the ASWO taught Hindu compositions to musicians from the Afghan National Army, during which training was provided to 10 soldiers for six months in Bangalore.

The title of "Air Warrior" is also reserved for the Air Warrior Drill Team.

== Structured events ==
The band performs at Presentation of Colours as well as the annual Delhi Republic Day parade on the Rajpath. In the latter parade, the band has come in a 75-member contingent and has been led by Warrant Officer Ashok Kumar for the last 12 years. It also performs at the Beating Retreat on Vijay Chowk, performing marches such as the Air Force Colour, Inspirato, and Subroto. It frequently performs at during State visits to New Delhi at the Rashtrapati Bhavan, hosted by the President of India. It has been present at prestigious international events in Germany, Finland, Sri Lanka and Bangladesh.
