= Madras Rifle Corps =

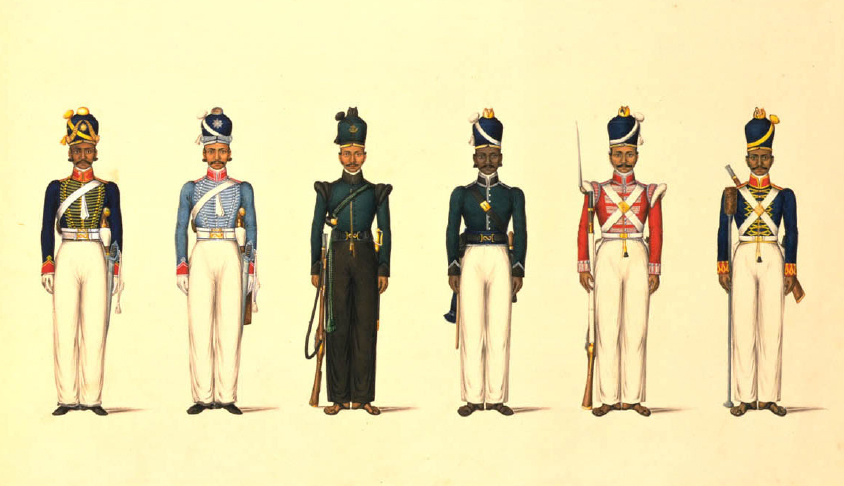
- Madras Rifle Corps, third from left
- Active: 1810–1869
- Country: India
- Allegiance: Honourable East India Company
- Branch: Madras Army
- Type: Infantry
- Role: Light Infantry
- Size: Battalion
- Equipment: Baker rifle

The Madras Rifle Corps was a light infantry battalion in the service of the Honourable East India Company.

== History ==
The battalion was established in the Madras Presidency of the HEIC on 10 February 1810 as the Madras Volunteer Battalion. Captain W. Munro, formerly of the 15th Regiment of Madras Native Infantry, was appointed to command of the battalion.

The authorised strength of the battalion at establishment was:

Europeans: 1 Captain Commandant, 3 Captains, 10 Lieutenants, 5 Ensigns, 1 Adjutant, 1 Surgeon, 1 Assistant Surgeon, 1 Sergeant Major, 1 Quartermaster Sergeant

Natives: 10 Subedars, 10 Jemadars, 50 Havildars, 50 Naiks, 900 Sepoys, 20 Drummers and Fifers, 12 Puckallies.

The battalion was renamed the Madras Rifle Corps in March 1814 and equipped with the Baker rifle. The battalion was highly distinguished in the Mahratta War of 1817–18.

In 1830, the battalion was broken up and individual rifle companies were attached to 1st, 5th, 16th, 24th, 26th, 36th, 38th and 49th regiments of Madras infantry. The separate rifle companies survived until 1869 when there were abolished.
