= Indian Army Chief's Band =

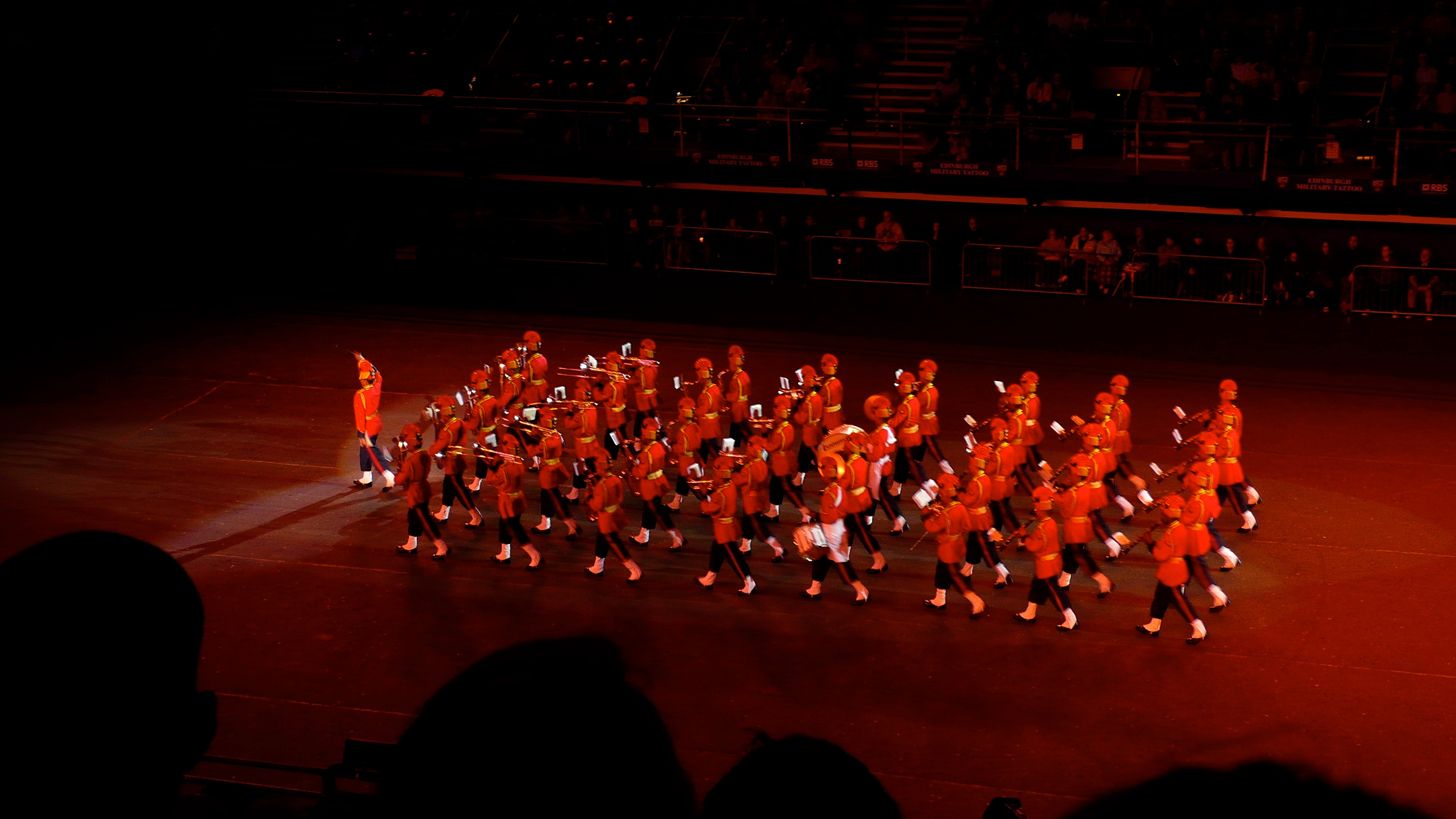
- The band during the Royal Edinburgh Military Tattoo.
- Active: 1990; 36 years ago
- Country: India
- Branch: Indian Army
- Size: 44 members
- Part of: Headquarters, Indian Army
- Garrison/HQ: New Delhi
- March: Quick: Qadam Qadam Badhaye Ja; Slow: Samman Guard

Commanders
- Current commander: Subedar Major Suresh Kumar Sharma

The Indian Army Chief's Band is the Indian Army's full-time music band. It was founded in 1990 as the official band of the Indian Army and the foremost in the armed forces. It also, as its name implies, represents the Chief of the Army Staff at events involving the COAS's presence. The band represents India in most important state events held in the Indian capital. It was raised in 1990 with bandsmen being drawn multiple Indian military bands in order to "retain the true representation of the entire nation in one band". In April 2011, a string section was added, consisting of cellos, violas and violins, elevating it to a symphony orchestra comprising 72 musicians. Outside of the Indian Army, it has also represented the Indian nation at various military music festivals in France, Italy, Sweden, Germany, Great Britain, Russia and Bangladesh.

== Structure ==
The band consists of the following ensembles:

- Parade Band
- Symphony Orchestra
- Brass ensemble
- Percussion ensemble
- Woodwind ensemble
- Jazz ensemble
- Vocalist group

Initially, the band played with percussion, brass and woodwind sections. Today, the band uses traditional Indian instruments such as the Mridangam, the Tabla, and the Carnatic. In addition other traditional instruments such as the Santoor, Sitar and Jaltarang have been incorporated in the band.

== Events ==
The band performs at ceremonial events with the Indian Army, including the Presentation of Colours and the annual Delhi Republic Day parade on the Rajpath. In the latter, the band is not a marching contingent but rather is located away from the road in an area near the national flag during which it performs Jana Gana Mana the presentation of honours by the President's Bodyguard. It also performs at state dinners held at the Rashtrapati Bhavan, hosted by the President of India for a foreign head of state. It also performs at community events in its vicinity.

=== Specific events ===
- The band took part in the Royal Edinburgh Military Tattoo in 2008.
- In July 2009, Indian military bands, a bands from the three services, with the Army band being one, marched down the Champs-Élysées in Paris with contingents from their respective services during the Bastille Day military parade to the sound of Indian martial tunes including Saare Jahan Se Achcha, Haste Lushai and Qadam Qadam Badhaye Ja.
- In September 2009, the band visited Russia to take part in the Spasskaya Tower Military Music Festival and Tattoo. During its performance on Moscow's Red Square, it went under the name of the Orchestra of the Supreme Commander of Chief of the Armed Forces of India (Russian: Оркестр Верховного Главнокомандующего Вооруженными Силами Индии).
- In June 2012, the band The performed at the Jammu Garrison for over 5000 soldiers and their families at Zorawar Stadium in Sunjuwan Cantonment.
- The Band was part of the Indian Army's Grand Symphony band that performed at Amity University, Noida campus during the 70th Independence Day celebrations in August 2016.
- The band under the direction of Subedar Nawab Khan took part in the JSDF Marching Festival.
- In April 2017, the band performed at a concert sponsored by the Ministry of Culture, Sports and Tourism of Vietnam and the Indian Embassy in Hanoi. During the performance, three Vietnamese artists accompanied the band in performing the music arranged.

== See also ==
India related

- Band of the Brigade of Gurkhas
- Beating retreat in India
- Deshon Ka Sartaj Bharat
- Indian military bands
- Military Music Wing
- Music of India
- President's Bodyguard
- Tri-Services Guard of Honour (India)
- Samman Guard

Other related

- Guard of honour
