= Deshon Ka Sartaj Bharat =

Song
- Composer: J.N. Roy Choudhury

Deshon Ka Sartaj Bharat ("India, Crown of the World") is a march played by the military of India, primarily the Indian Army. It was composed by J.N. Roy Choudhury, who was an instructor of music at the Military Music Wing, Army Education Corps Centre & College, Pachmarhi, Madhya Pradesh.

This march has been arranged for both full military band and pipe band.
