= Culture of Germany =

The culture of Germany has been shaped by its central position in Europe and a history spanning over a millennium. Known for significant contributions to art, music, philosophy, religion, science and technology, German culture is diverse and influential. Germany remained in a state of Kleinstaaterei (lit. 'small-state-ery') for long periods, leading to a wide variety of regional customs and traditions. From the medieval Holy Roman Empire to the modern Federal Republic, German culture has absorbed influences from across the continent and beyond. Key aspects include a strong emphasis on education and craftsmanship, a long literary tradition featuring figures like Goethe and Schiller, a musical heritage from Bach to Beethoven, and a philosophical legacy including Kant and Marx. Germany is also known for its numerous festivals, regional cuisines, and a commitment to preserving its historical heritage while embracing contemporary trends in art, architecture, and popular culture.

== Language ==
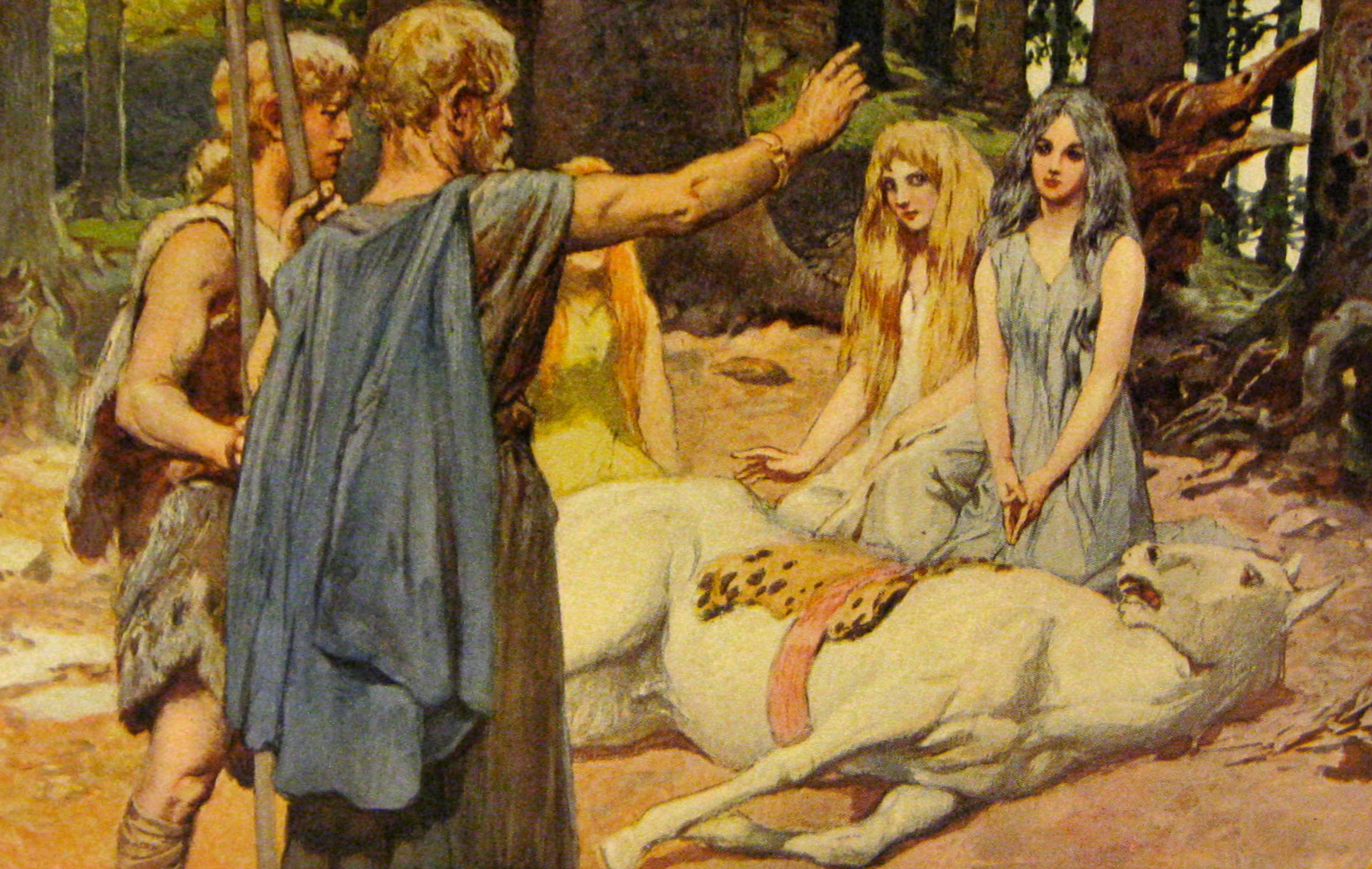
Emil Doepler's depiction of the Second Merseburg Charm, one of the only known examples of Continental Germanic paganism preserved in Old High German

German is the official and predominant language of Germany. It is one of the 24 official and working languages of the European Union. EU institutions may determine how they implement their language arrangements internally. Under the European Charter for Regional or Minority Languages, Germany recognises Danish, Upper Sorbian, Lower Sorbian, North Frisian, Saterland Frisian and the Romani of the German Sinti and Roma as minority languages, while Low German is recognised as a regional language. The 2024 German microcensus shows 77% of private households spoke only German at home, and 17% used German plus another language. Turkish, Russian, and Arabic were most common among non-German-speaking households.

Standard German is a West Germanic language and is closely related to and classified alongside English, Dutch, and the Frisian languages. To a lesser extent, it is also related to the East (extinct) and North Germanic languages. Most German vocabulary is derived from the Germanic branch of the Indo-European language family. Significant minorities of words are derived from Latin and Greek, with a smaller amount from French and most recently English (known as Denglisch). German is written using the Latin alphabet. In addition to the 26 standard letters, German has three vowels with Umlaut, namely ä, ö, and ü, as well as the Eszett or scharfes S (sharp s) which is written "ß" (not used in Switzerland and Liechtenstein, where it is written ss instead). German orthography has gone through a series of reforms, the most recent in 1996.

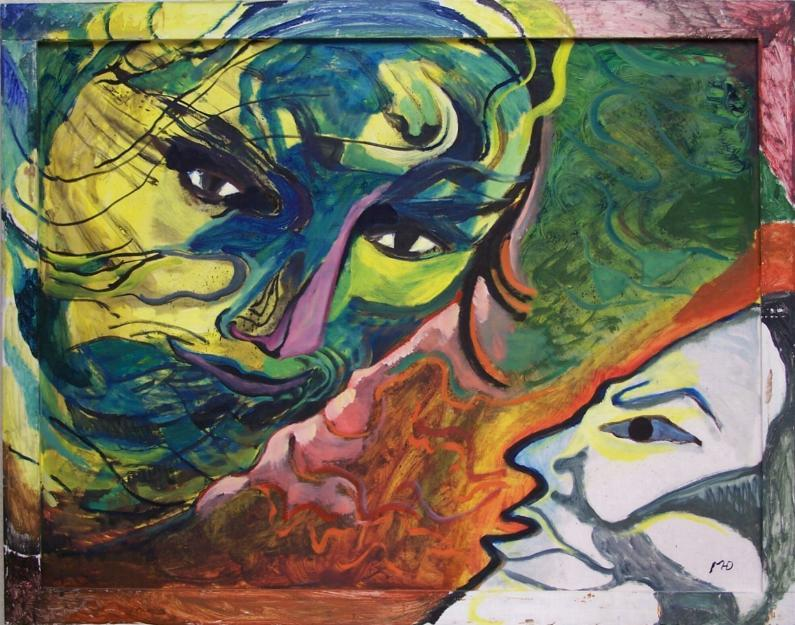

Spoken German in Goethe's Faust

German dialects are distinguished from varieties of standard German. German dialects are traditional local varieties and can be traced back to the different German tribes. Many of them are not easily understandable to a speaker of standard German, since they often differ in lexicon, phonology, and syntax.

Around the world, German has approximately 100 million native speakers and also about 80 million non-native speakers. German is the main language of about 90 million people (18%) in the EU. 67% of German citizens claim to be able to communicate in at least one foreign language, 27% in at least two languages other than their first.

In the German diaspora, aspects of German culture are passed on to younger generations through naming customs and through the use of spoken and written German. The Goethe Institute seeks to spread the knowledge of German culture worldwide. A total of 15.5 million people are currently learning German as a second language.

== Literature ==
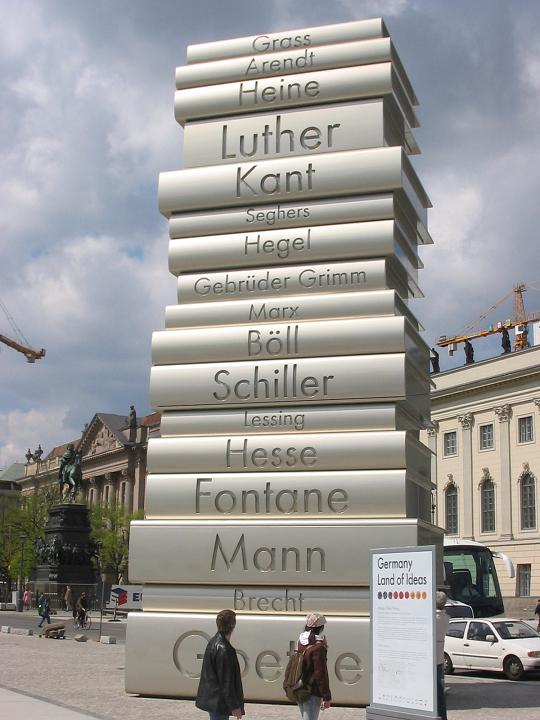
Sculpture in Berlin depicting the names of Grass, Arendt, Heine, Luther, Kant, Seghers, Hegel, Brothers Grimm, Marx, Böll, Schiller Lessing, Hesse, Fontane, Mann, Brecht and Goethe.

German literature can be traced back to the Middle Ages, with the most notable authors of the period being Walther von der Vogelweide and Wolfram von Eschenbach. The Nibelungenlied, whose author remains unknown, is also an important work of the epoch, as is the Thidrekssaga. The fairy tales collections collected and published by Jacob and Wilhelm Grimm in the 19th century became famous throughout the world.

Land der Dichter und Denker (Land of poets and thinkers) is a phrase used by many Germans to refer to Germany, though it is hardly known in non-German-speaking countries. It is occasionally used to describe certain cities as well (Stadt der Dichter und Denker), such as Tübingen and Jena.

Theologian Luther, who translated the Bible into German, is widely credited for having set the basis for the modern "High German" language.

Among the most admired German philosophers and authors are Lessing, Goethe, Schiller, Kleist, Annette von Droste-Hülshoff, Hoffmann, Brecht, Heine and Schmidt. Nine Germans have won the Nobel Prize in Literature: Theodor Mommsen, Paul von Heyse, Gerhart Hauptmann, Thomas Mann, Nelly Sachs, Hermann Hesse, Heinrich Böll, Günter Grass, and Herta Müller.

== Philosophy ==
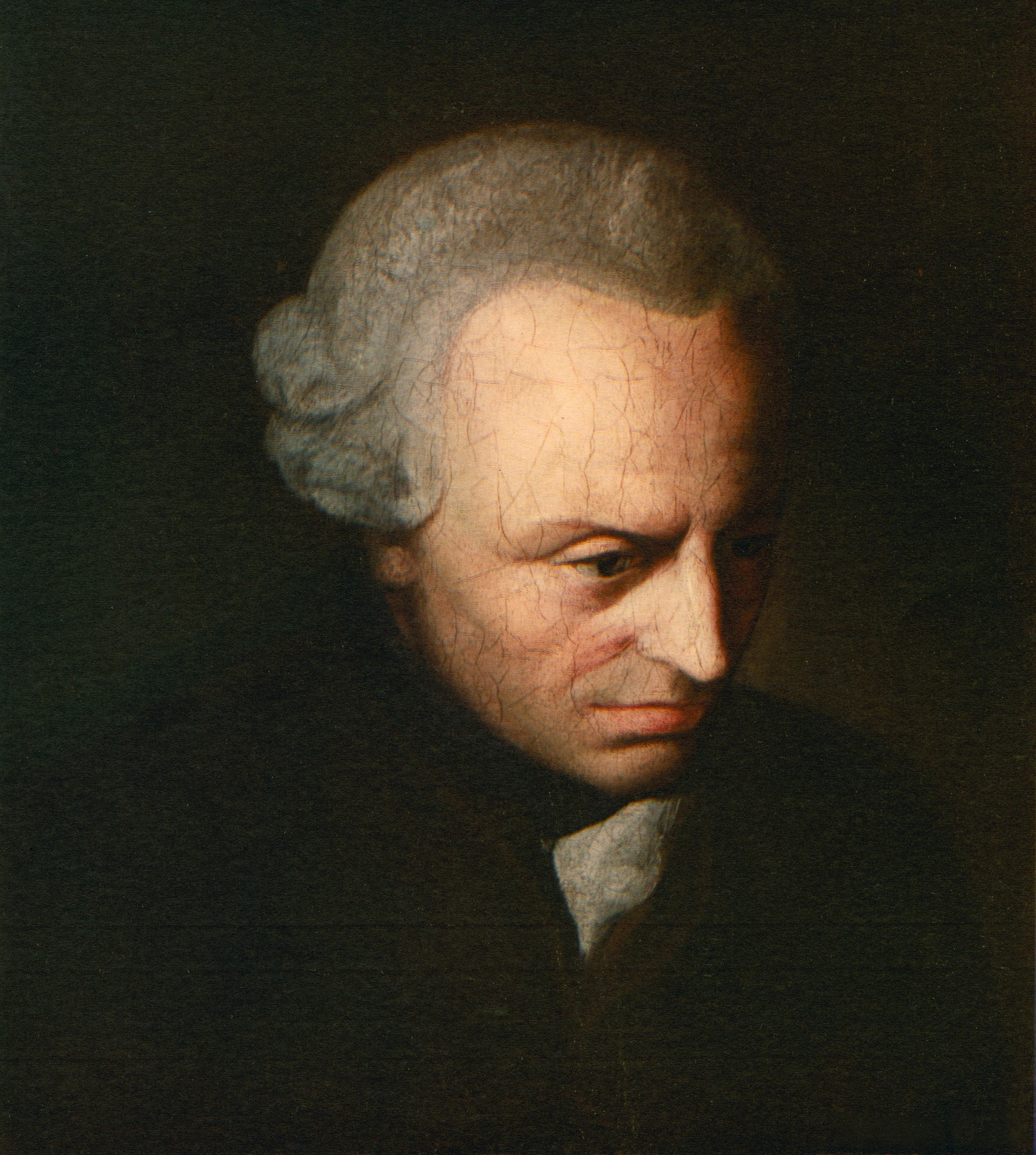
Philosopher Immanuel Kant

The rise of the modern natural sciences and the related decline of religion raised a series of questions, which recur throughout German philosophy, concerning the relationships between knowledge and faith, reason and emotion, and scientific, ethical, and artistic ways of seeing the world.

German philosophers have helped shape western philosophy from as early as the Middle Ages (Albertus Magnus). Later, Leibniz (17th century) and most importantly Kant played central roles in the history of philosophy. Kantianism inspired the work of Schopenhauer and Nietzsche as well as German idealism defended by Fichte and Hegel. Ludwig Feuerbach became one of the founders of modern atheism. Marx and Engels developed the communist theory in the second half of the 19th century while Heidegger and Gadamer pursued the tradition of German philosophy in the 20th century. A number of German intellectuals were also influential in sociology, most notably Adorno, Elias, Habermas, Horkheimer, Luhmann, Marcuse, Simmel, Tönnies, and Weber. The University of Berlin founded in 1810 by linguist and philosopher Wilhelm von Humboldt served as an influential model for a number of modern western universities.

In the 21st century Germany has been an important country for the development of contemporary analytic philosophy in continental Europe, along with France, Austria, Switzerland and the Scandinavian countries.

== Military ==
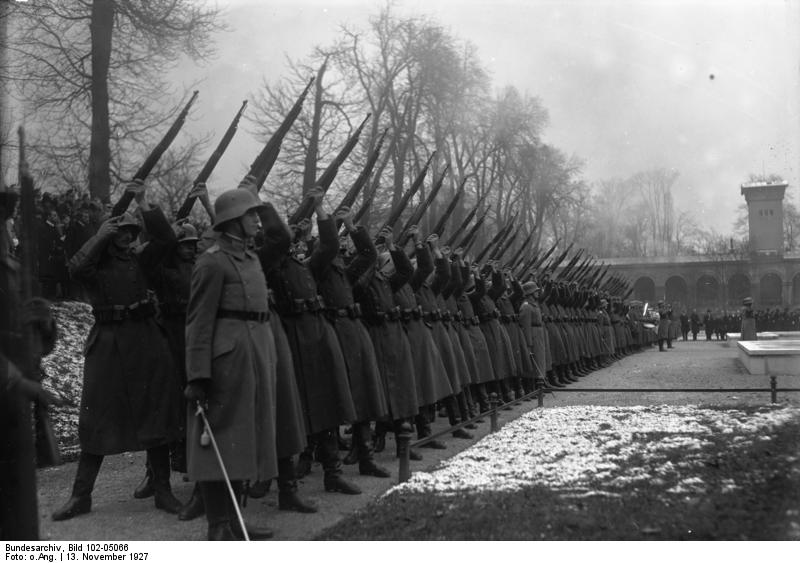
The Reichswehr honoring the fallen of World War I.

Germany's military has historically influenced German society and culture. In the 18th century, Prussia rose as a military powerhouse under Frederick the Great, whose reforms entrenched a culture of Prussian virtues. German unification in 1871 created the Imperial German Army, which played key roles in World War I. The interwar Reichswehr evolved into the Wehrmacht under Nazi rule, leading to World War II. After 1945, Germany was demilitarized, later forming the Bundeswehr in 1955 as a NATO force.

German military thought and studies are globally influential. Major works include Frederick the Great's Instructions for His Generals, Clausewitz's On War, Moltke's Instructions for Large Unit Commanders, Schlieffen's Cannae, von der Goltz's The Nation in Arms, Delbrück's History of the Art of War, Bernhardi's Germany and the Next War, Seeckt's Thoughts of a Soldier, Ludendorff's The Total War and Guderian's Achtung – Panzer!.

Postwar West German military developed Innere Führung ("leadership development and civic education"), centred on the ideal of the "citizen in uniform" and intended to change soldiers' mindset into a liberal democratic form.

In East Germany, the National People's Army, founded in 1956, followed SED ideals. The NVA's Prussian traditions led West Germans to label East Germany "Red Prussia." At reunification, the NVA was disbanded under the process known as the Armee der Einheit ("Army of Unity") into the Bundeswehr.

German military traditions to military music and public ceremonial culture, and military songs, including Preußens Gloria, Yorckscher Marsch, Königgrätzer Marsch, Alte Kameraden, Pariser Einzugsmarsch, Badenweiler Marsch, Erika, Panzerlied, Westerwaldlied, Lili Marleen, Argonnerwaldlied and Schwarzbraun ist die Haselnuss. Ceremonies like the Großer Zapfenstreichand the Wachbataillon.

Military experience has also influenced German literature, particularly through war novels, memoirs and anti-war literature. Major writers and works such as Heinrich von Kleist's The Prince of Homburg, Heinrich Mann's The Loyal Subject, Ernst Jünger's Storm of Steel, Erich Maria Remarque's All Quiet on the Western Front, Arnold Zweig's The Case of Sergeant Grischa, Wolfgang Borchert's The Man Outside, Heinrich Böll's The Train Was on Time, Hans Hellmut Kirst's 08/15 and The Night of the Generals, Dieter Noll's The Adventures of Werner Holt and Günter Grass's The Tin Drum.

== Music ==
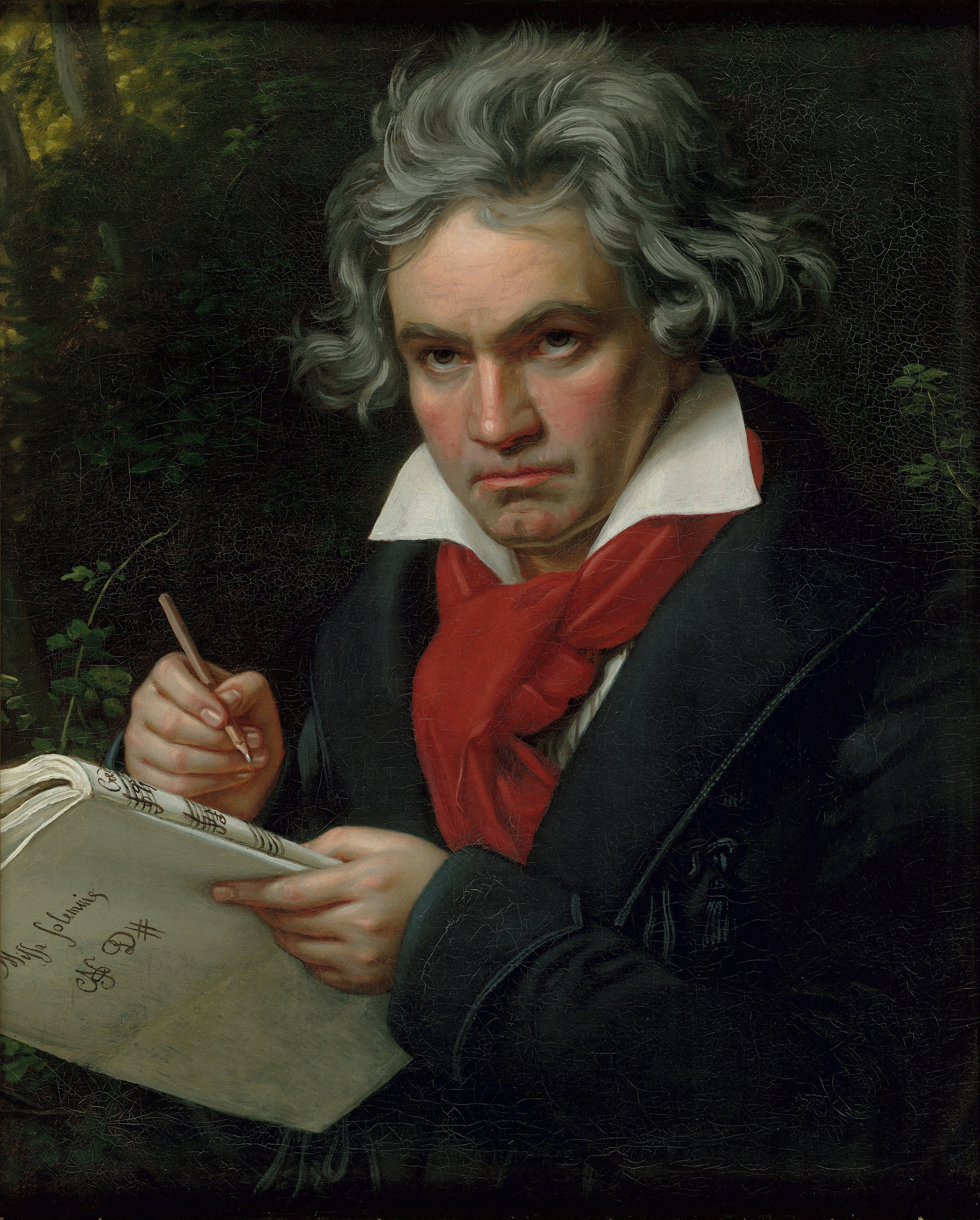
Ludwig van Beethoven was an influential German composer and pianist.

In the field of music, Germany claims some of the most renowned classical composers of the world, including Bach, Mozart and Beethoven, who marked the transition between the Classical and Romantic eras in Western classical music. Also, Germans developed many Lutheran chorales and hymns.

Other composers of the Austro-German tradition who achieved international fame include Brahms, Wagner, Haydn, Johann Pachelbel, Schubert, Händel, Schumann, Mendelssohn Bartholdy, Johann Strauss II, Bruckner, Mahler, Telemann, Richard Strauss, Schoenberg, Orff, and most recently, Henze, Lachenmann, and Stockhausen.

Germany is the largest music market in Europe, and third largest in the world. It has exerted a strong influence on rock and heavy metal music. Artists such as Herbert Grönemeyer, Scorpions, Blind Guardian, Rammstein, Nena, Unheilig, Xavier Naidoo, Tokio Hotel and Modern Talking have enjoyed international fame.

German musicians have contributed heavily to developments in electronic music, in synth-pop, electronic body music, trance and hardcore. Krautrock band Kraftwerk are considered to be the pioneers of synth-pop, electro, techno, and house music. Tangerine Dream's "Love on a Real Train" was a major influence on the development of synthwave.

German popular music of the 20th and 21st centuries includes the movements of Neue Deutsche Welle (Nena, Alphaville), Ostrock (City, Keimzeit), metal/rock (Scorpions, Rammstein), punk (Nina Hagen, Böhse Onkelz, Die Ärzte, Die Toten Hosen), pop rock (Beatsteaks), indie (Tocotronic, Blumfeld) and hip hop (Die Fantastischen Vier, Deichkind). A global trendsetter is the German techno and minimal scene (e.g. Ricardo Villalobos, Paul Kalkbrenner and Sven Väth).

Germany hosts many large rock music festivals every year. The Rock am Ring festival is the largest music festival in Germany, and among the largest in the world. German artists also make up a large percentage of industrial and Neue Deutsche Härte acts. Germany hosts some of the largest goth or dark culture scenes and festivals in the entire world, with events like Wave-Gotik-Treffen and M'era Luna Festival attracting up to 30,000 people. In addition, the country hosts Wacken Open Air, the biggest heavy metal open air festival in the world.

Since about 1970, Germany has once again had a thriving popular culture, now increasingly led by its reinstated capital Berlin, and a self-confident music and art scene. Germany is also very well known for its many renowned opera houses, such as Semperoper, Komische Oper Berlin and Munich State Theatre. Richard Wagner established the Bayreuth Festspielhaus.

One of the most famous composers of the international film business is Hans Zimmer. The year 2020 was designated "Beethoven Year" to mark 250 years since the composer was born.

== Cinema ==
German cinema dates back to the very early years of the medium with the work of Max Skladanowsky. It was particularly influential during the years of the Weimar Republic with German expressionists such as Robert Wiene and Friedrich Wilhelm Murnau. Austrian-based director Fritz Lang, who became a German citizen in 1926 and whose career flourished in the pre-war German film industry, is said to have been a major influence on Hollywood cinema. His silent movie Metropolis (1927) is referred to as the birth of modern Science Fiction movies. Founded in 1912, the Babelsberg Film Studio is the oldest large-scale film studio in the world.

In 1930, Josef von Sternberg directed The Blue Angel, which was the first major German sound film and it brought world fame to actress Marlene Dietrich. Impressionist documentary Berlin: Symphony of a Great City, directed by Walter Ruttmann, is a prominent example of the city symphony genre. The Nazi era produced mostly propaganda films although the work of Leni Riefenstahl still introduced new aesthetics to film.

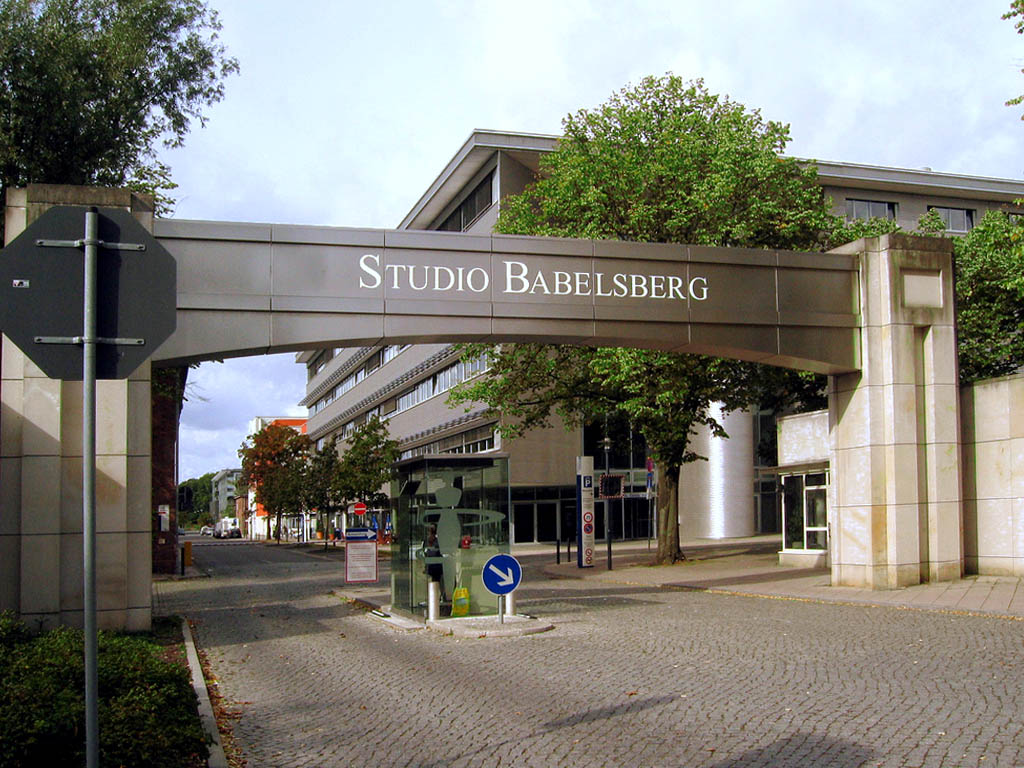
The Babelsberg Studio near Berlin is one of Europe's large-scale film locations.

During the 1970s and 1980s, New German Cinema directors such as Volker Schlöndorff, Margarethe von Trotta, Werner Herzog, Wim Wenders, and Rainer Werner Fassbinder put West German cinema back on the international stage with their often provocative films.

More recently, films such as Good Bye Lenin! (2003), Gegen die Wand (Head-on) (2004), Der Untergang (Downfall) (2004), and Der Baader Meinhof Komplex (2008) have enjoyed international success.

The Academy Award for Best Foreign Language Film went to the German production Die Blechtrommel (The Tin Drum) in 1979, to Nowhere in Africa in 2002, and to Das Leben der Anderen (The Lives of Others) in 2007. Among the most famous German actors are Marlene Dietrich, Klaus Kinski, Hanna Schygulla, Armin Mueller-Stahl, Jürgen Prochnow, Thomas Kretschmann, Til Schweiger and Daniel Brühl.

The Berlin Film Festival, held annually since 1951, is one of the world's foremost film festivals. An international jury places emphasis on representing films from all over the world and awards the winners with the Golden and Silver Bears. The annual European Film Awards ceremony is held every second year in the city of Berlin, where the European Film Academy (EFA) is located. The Babelsberg Studios in Potsdam are the oldest large-scale film studios in the world and a centre for international film production.

== Media ==
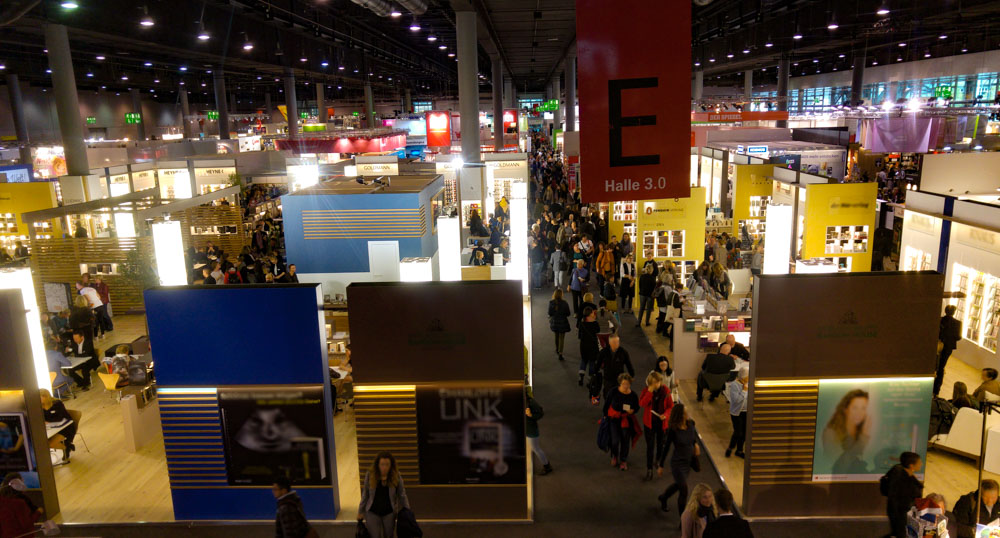
The Frankfurt Book Fair in 2016

Germany's television market is the largest in Europe, with 34,000,000 TV households. The many regional and national public broadcasters are organised in line with the federal political structure. Around 90% of German households have cable or satellite TV, and viewers can choose from a variety of free-to-view public and commercial channels. Pay-TV services have not become popular or successful while public TV broadcasters ZDF and ARD offer a range of digital-only channels. Reality TV is the most popular programming in Germany and a key part in modern German culture.

Germany is home to some of the world's largest media conglomerates, including Bertelsmann, the Axel Springer AG and ProSiebenSat.1 Media.

The German-speaking book publishers produce about 700,000,000 copies of books every year, with about 80,000 titles, nearly 60,000 of them new publications. Germany is in third place on international statistics after the English-speaking book market and the People's Republic of China. The Frankfurt Book Fair is considered to be the most important book fair in the world for international deals and trading and has a tradition that spans over 500 years.

Many of Europe's best-selling newspapers and magazines are produced in Germany. The papers with the highest circulation are Die Zeit, Süddeutsche Zeitung, Frankfurter Allgemeine Zeitung and Die Welt, the largest magazines include Der Spiegel, Stern and Focus. The Bild is a tabloid and has the largest circulation of all German papers.

However, the publishing industry is in flux – amongst other things because meanwhile almost 800,000 newspaper copies sold daily are distributed digitally and the number of digital subscriptions is continually rising. Nevertheless, a total of around 38 million people in Germany still read a printed newspaper every day, while around 14.6 million make use of newspapers’ digital offerings.

== Architecture and World Heritage ==
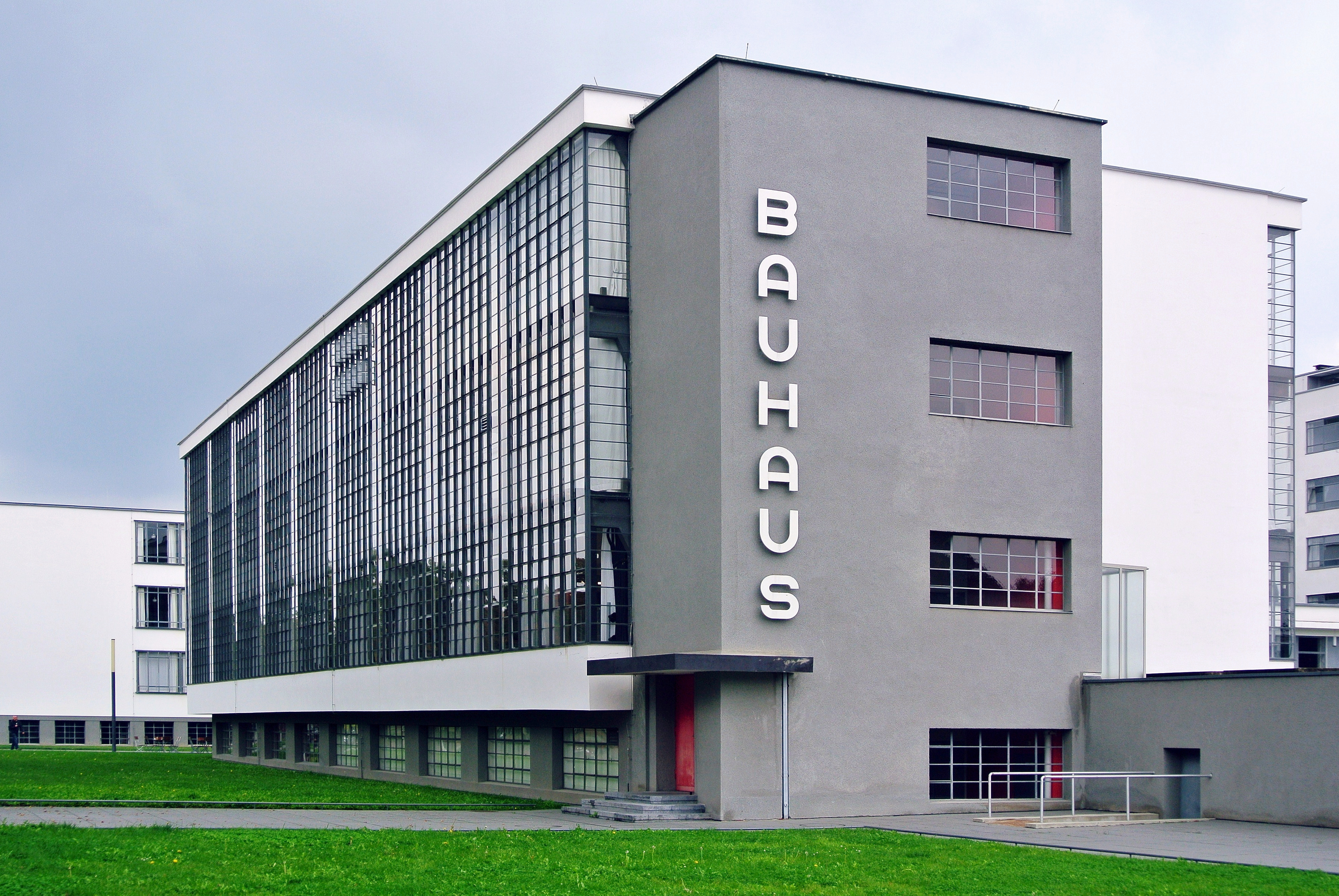
Bauhaus building (Germany). The Bauhaus style co-started modernist architecture.

Architectural contributions from Germany include the Carolingian and Ottonian styles, important precursors of Romanesque. The region has also produced significant works in styles such as the Gothic, Renaissance and Baroque.

The nation was particularly important in the early modern movement through the Deutscher Werkbund and the Bauhaus movement identified with Walter Gropius. The Nazis closed these movements and favoured a type of neo-classicism. Since World War II post-modern structures have been built. Since the reunification of Germany the trend has continued.

UNESCO has inscribed 55 properties in Germany on the World Heritage List.

== Art ==
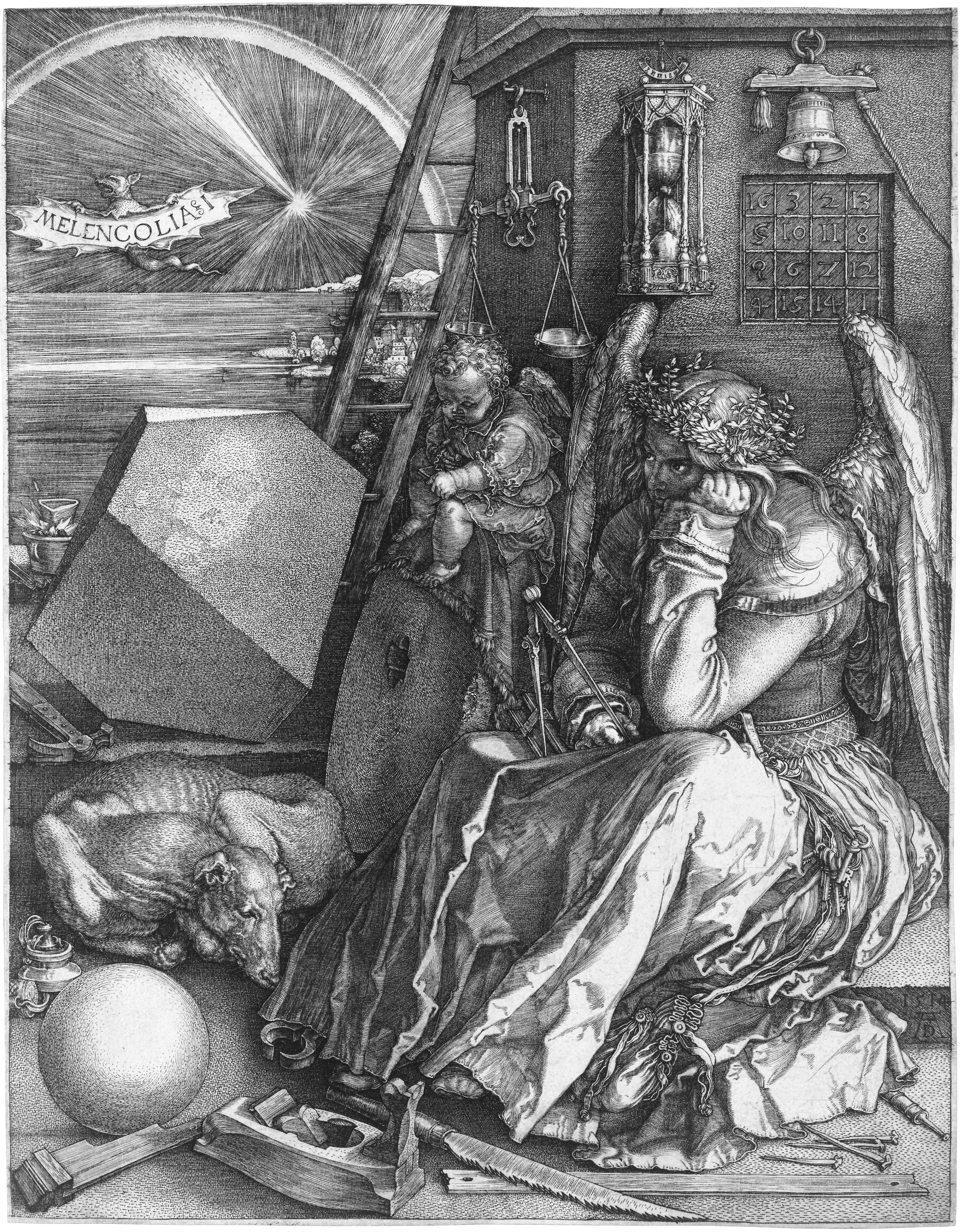
Melencolia I, 1514, engraving by Albrecht Dürer

German art has a long and distinguished tradition in the visual arts, from the earliest known work of figurative art to its current output of contemporary art. Celtic art and Germanic art both partially originated in Germany.

Carolingian and Ottonian art played a role in the origin of Romanesque art.

Important German Renaissance painters include Albrecht Altdorfer, Lucas Cranach the Elder, Matthias Grünewald, Hans Holbein the Younger and the well-known Albrecht Dürer. The most important Baroque artists from Germany are Cosmas Damian Asam. Further artists are the painter Anselm Kiefer, romantic Caspar David Friedrich, the surrealist Max Ernst, the conceptualist Joseph Beuys, or Wolf Vostell or the neo-expressionist Georg Baselitz.

Within modern day society, contemporary art is a large aspect of the culture. This large community draws in people from all around the world. There are around 500 galleries in Germany that caters to this modern form of art. Art Cologne is a popular fair that displays contemporary art.

== Politics ==
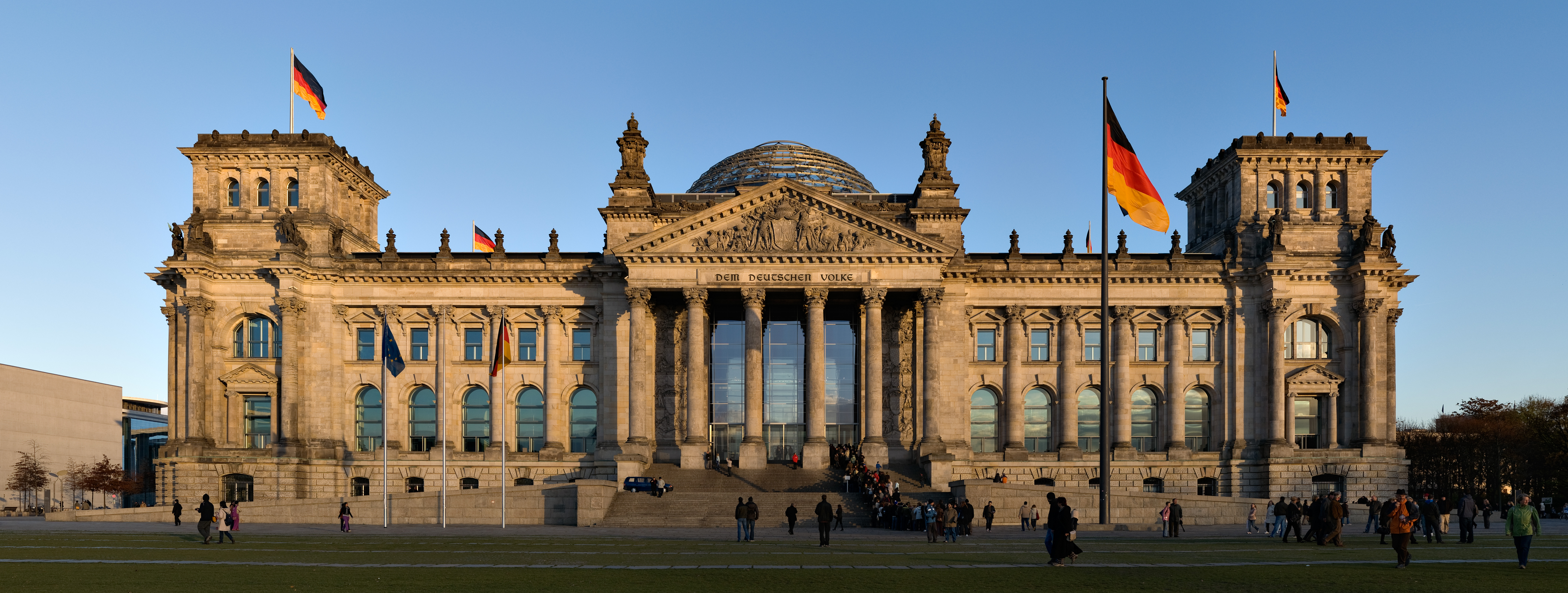
The Reichstag in Berlin, the seat of German parliament since 1999.

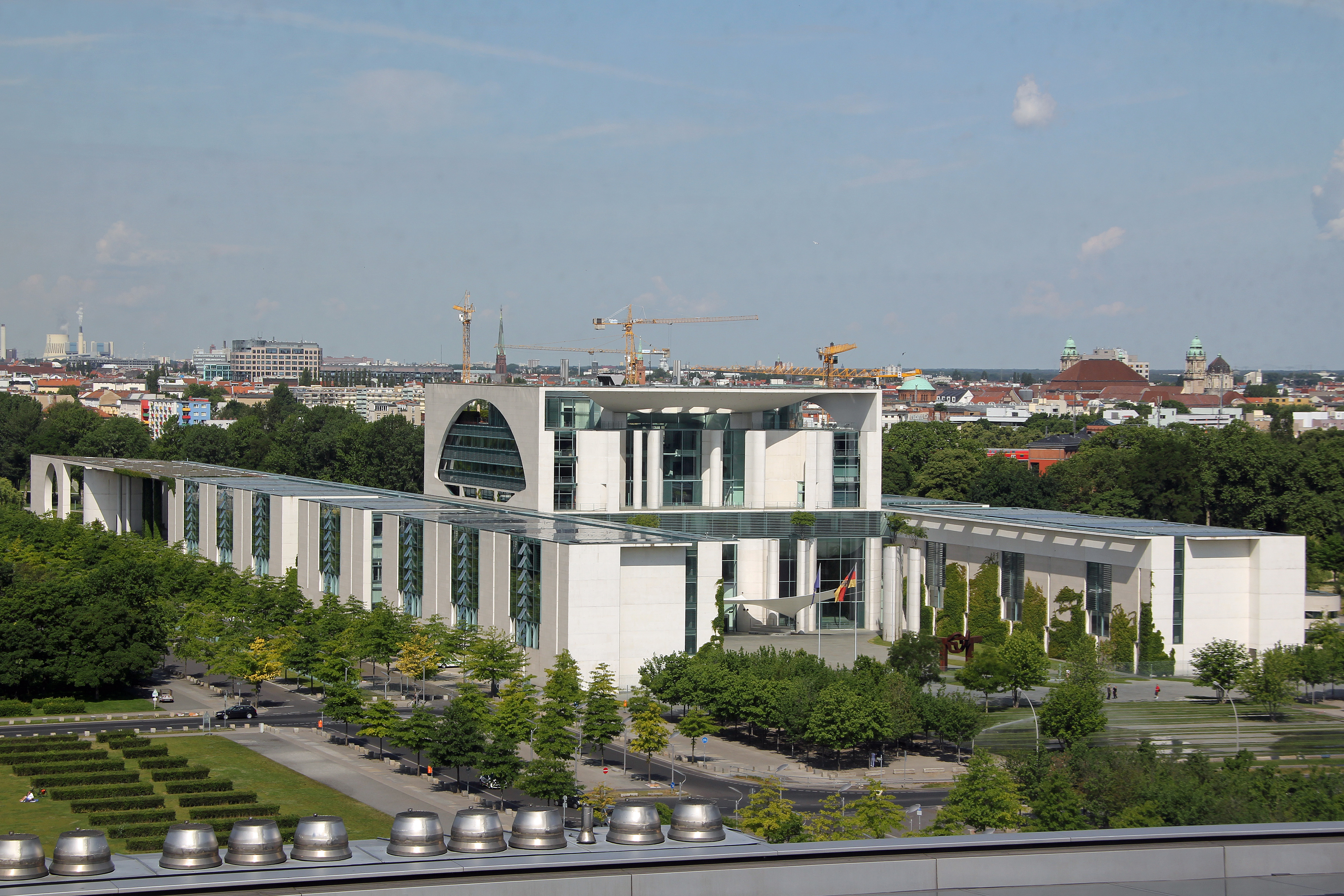
Federal Chancellery in Berlin, largest government headquarters in the world.

Germany is a federal, parliamentary, representative democratic republic. Federal legislative power is vested in the parliament consisting of the Bundestag (Federal Diet) and Bundesrat (Federal Council), which together form the legislative body. The Bundestag is elected through direct elections using a personalised proportional representation system. The members of the Bundesrat represent and are appointed by the governments of the sixteen federated states. The German political system operates under a framework laid out in the 1949 constitution known as the Grundgesetz (Basic Law). Amendments generally require a two-thirds majority of both the Bundestag and the Bundesrat; the fundamental principles of the constitution, as expressed in the articles guaranteeing human dignity, the separation of powers, the federal structure, and the rule of law, are valid in perpetuity.

The president, who has been Frank-Walter Steinmeier since 2017, is the head of state and invested primarily with representative responsibilities and powers. He is elected by the Bundesversammlung (federal convention), an institution consisting of the members of the Bundestag and an equal number of state delegates. The second-highest official in the German order of precedence is the Bundestagspräsident (President of the Bundestag), who is elected by the Bundestag and responsible for overseeing the daily sessions of the body. The third-highest official and the head of government is the chancellor, who is elected by the Bundestag and appointed by the federal president. The chancellor, who has been Friedrich Merz since 2025, is the head of government and exercises executive power through his Cabinet.

Since 1949, the party system has been dominated by the Christian Democratic Union and the Social Democratic Party of Germany. So far every chancellor has been a member of one of these parties. However, the smaller liberal Free Democratic Party and the Alliance 90/The Greens have also been junior partners in coalition governments. Since 2007, the democratic socialist party The Left has been a staple in the German Bundestag, though they have never been part of the federal government. In the 2017 German federal election, the right-wing populist Alternative for Germany gained enough votes to attain representation in the parliament for the first time.

A global opinion poll for the BBC revealed that Germany is recognized for having the most positive influence in the world in 2011, 2013, and 2014.

== Religion ==
Christianity was introduced to the area of modern Germany by 300 AD and became fully Christianized by the time of Charlemagne in the eighth and ninth century. After the Reformation started by Martin Luther in the early 16th century, many people left the Catholic Church and became Protestant, mainly Lutheran and Calvinist. 59.4% of the German population belongs to Christian denominations: 30% are Roman Catholic, and 29% are affiliated with Protestantism (the figures are known accurately because Germany imposes a church tax on those who disclose a religious affiliation).

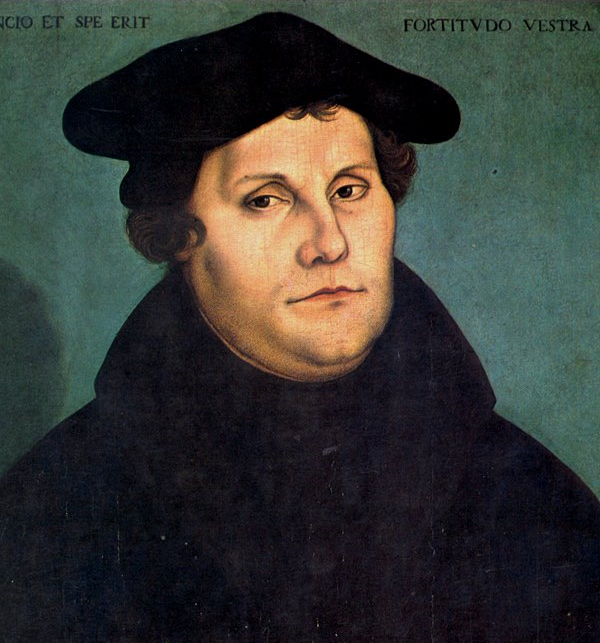
Portrait of Martin Luther by Lucas Cranach the Elder

The north and east are predominantly Protestant, the south and west predominantly Catholic. Nowadays there is a non-religious majority in Hamburg and the former East German states. Germany was, at one point, almost in its entirety within the Roman Catholic Holy Roman Empire, but was also the source of Protestant reformers such as Martin Luther. During the Kulturkampf (from about 1872 to 1886) the government opposed the Catholic church.

Historically, Germany had a substantial Jewish population. Only a few thousand people of Jewish origin remained in Germany after the Holocaust, but the German Jewish community now has about 100,000 members, many from the former Soviet Union. Germany also has a substantial Muslim population, most of whom are descendants of Turkish workers from Turkey.

German theologians include Luther, Melanchthon, Schleiermacher, and Rudolf Otto. Germany was also the origin of many mystics, including Meister Eckhart and Jakob Boehme; and of Pope Benedict XVI.

== Holidays and celebrations ==
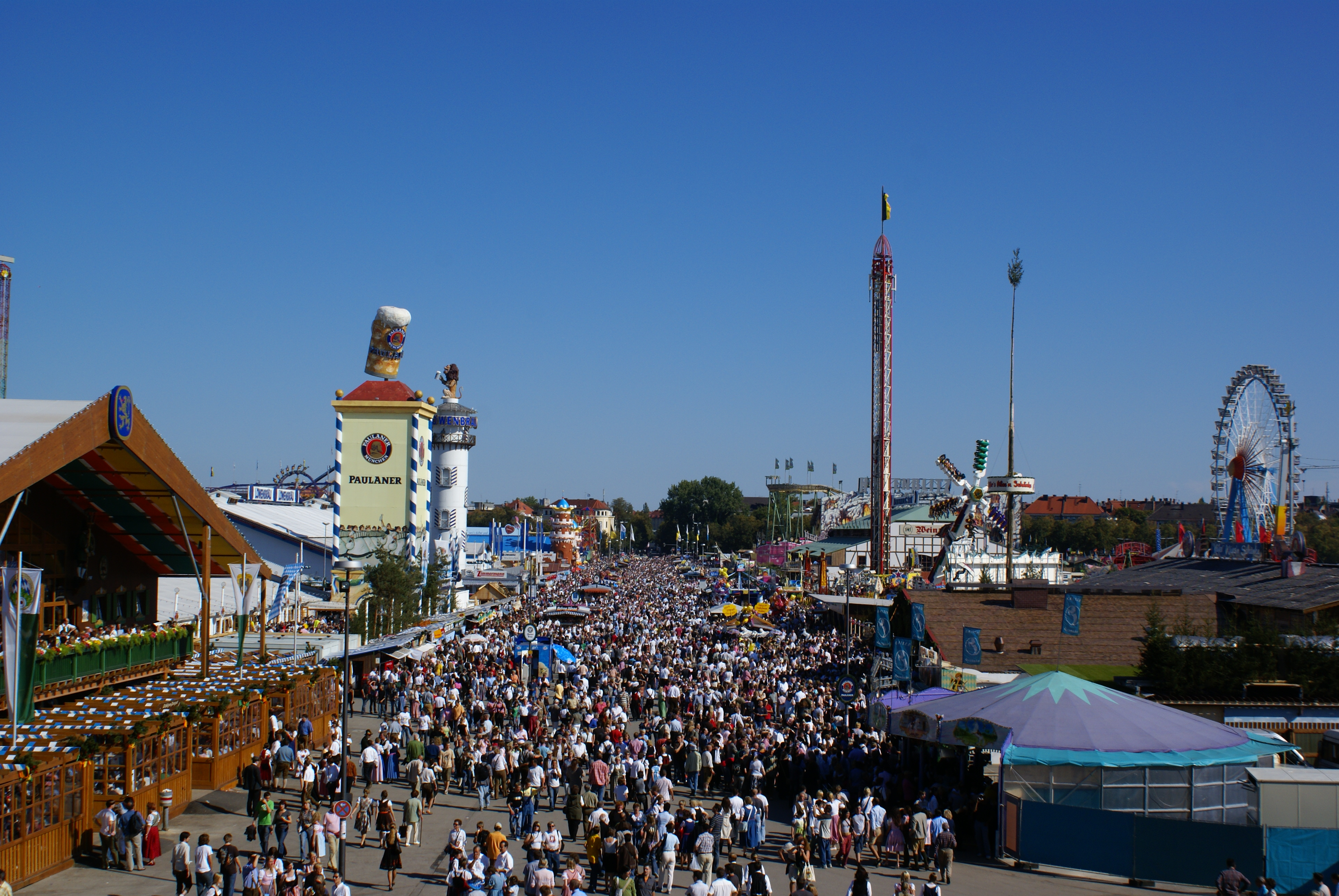
The Oktoberfest in Munich is the world's largest fair

There are a number of public holidays in Germany. The country is particularly known for its Oktoberfest celebrations in Munich, its carnival culture and globally influential Christmas customs known as Weihnachten. 3 October has been the national day of Germany since 1990, celebrated as the German Unity Day (Tag der Deutschen Einheit).

== Science ==
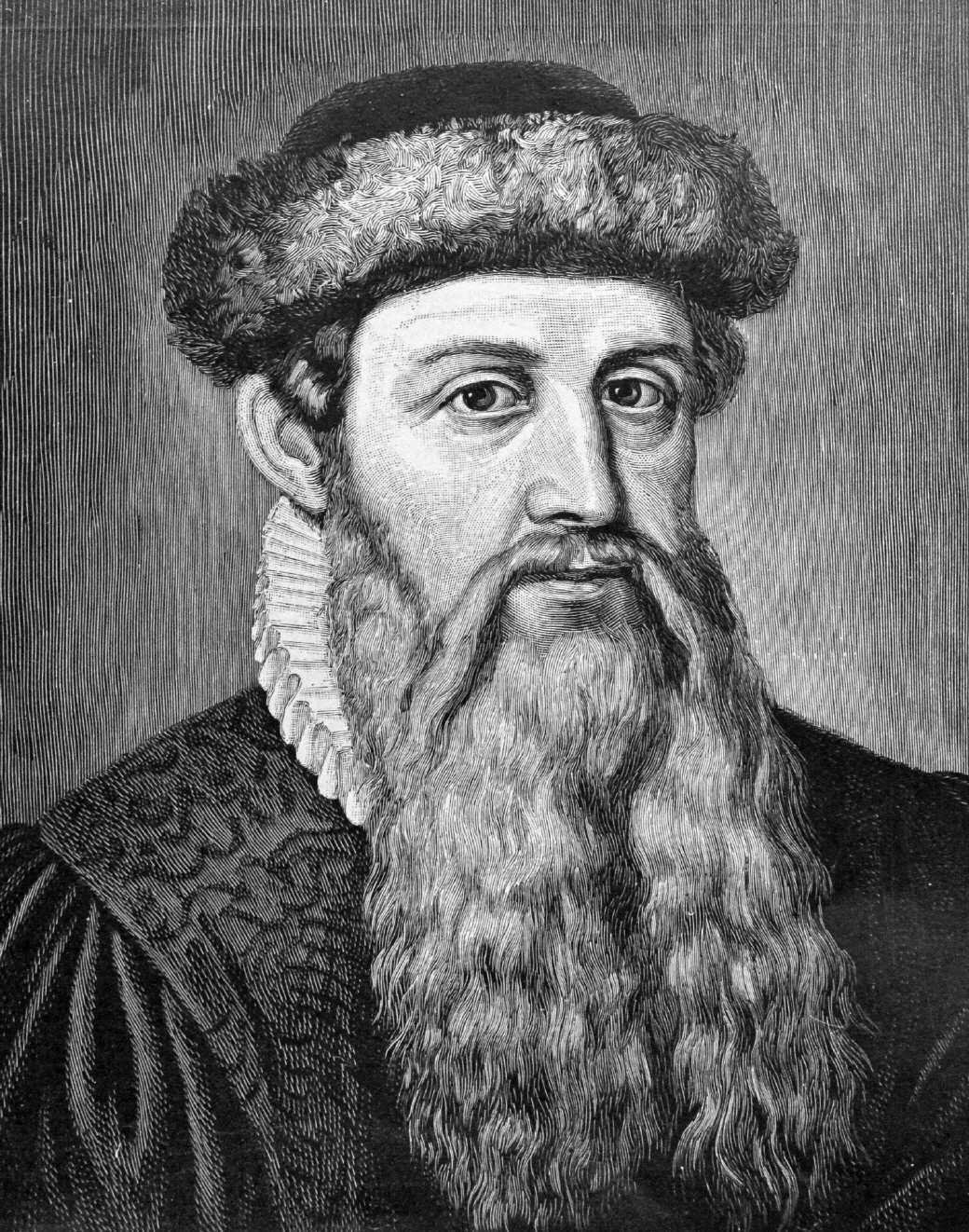
Johannes Gutenberg started the Printing Revolution by inventing the movable-type printing press.

Germany has been the home of many famous inventors and engineers, such as Johannes Gutenberg, who is credited with the invention of the movable-type printing press; Hans Geiger, the creator of the Geiger counter; and Konrad Zuse, who completed the fully automatic programmable Z3 computer in 1941.

German inventors, engineers and industrialists such as Zeppelin, Lilienthal, Daimler, Diesel, Otto, Wankel, von Braun and Benz helped shape modern automotive and air transportation technology including the beginnings of space travel. In the 1870s, Ernst Abbe worked with Carl Zeiss in optics to improve microscope lenses, leading to the development of microscope objectives.

Earlier scientific achievements included Johannes Kepler's laws of planetary motion, shaping modern astronomy. In mathematics, Carl Friedrich Gauss's Disquisitiones Arithmeticae (1801) established systematic number theory. Gottfried Wilhelm Leibniz was instrumental in the development of calculus, independently of Isaac Newton, and in establishing the mathematical notation that he introduced and that remains in use today. Emmy Noether contributed to abstract algebra and proved Noether's theorem connecting symmetry and conservation laws.

The work of Albert Einstein, Max Planck, and Werner Heisenberg was crucial to the foundation of modern physics. They were preceded by such key physicists as Hermann von Helmholtz, Joseph von Fraunhofer, and Gabriel Daniel Fahrenheit, among others. Wilhelm Conrad Röntgen discovered X-rays, an accomplishment that earned him the first Nobel Prize in Physics in 1901. Otto Hahn and Fritz Strassmann made discoveries which revealed nuclear fission. In chemistry, Justus von Liebig developed practical laboratory teaching at the University of Giessen. Fritz Haber and Carl Bosch developed the Haber–Bosch process for industrial ammonia production and fertilizer manufacture. In microbiology, Robert Koch reported Mycobacterium tuberculosis as the agent responsible for tuberculosis in 1882. Rudolf Virchow founded cellular pathology. Paul Ehrlich's laboratory discovered arsphenamine, the first effective medicinal treatment for syphilis. Alexander von Humboldt was a naturalist who established biogeography through studying plants.

Before World War II, Germany had produced more Nobel laureates in scientific fields than any other nation, and was the preeminent country in the natural sciences. Germany is currently the nation with the 3rd most Nobel Prize winners, 115. The Walhalla temple for "laudable and distinguished Germans" features a number of scientists, and is located east of Regensburg, in Bavaria.

Germany is home to some of the finest academic centers in Europe. Some famous universities are those of Munich and Berlin, University of Tübingen, University of Göttingen, University of Marburg, University of Berlin, Mining Academy Freiberg and Freiburg University, among many others. Moreover, the Ruprecht-Karls-Universität Heidelberg is one of the oldest universities in Europe. While Wilhelm von Humboldt promoted academic freedom to integrate teaching and research. Beyond campuses, from fundamental research by the Max Planck Society to applied research by the Fraunhofer Society, scientific advancement is being supported.

== Fashion and design ==
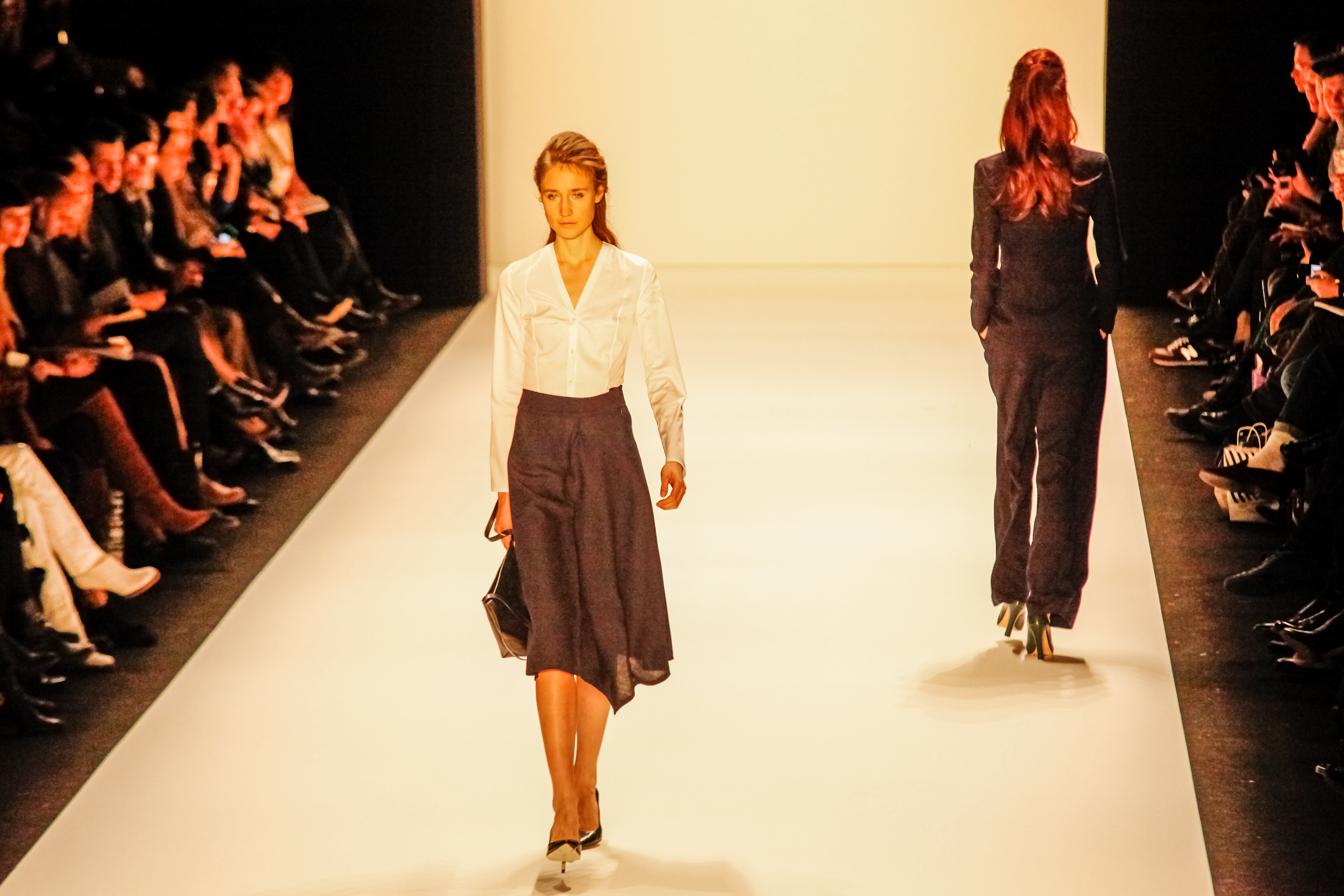
Berlin Fashion Week

German designers were leaders of modern product design, with the Bauhaus designers like Mies van der Rohe, and Dieter Rams of Braun being essential.

Germany is a leading country in the fashion industry. The German textile industry consisted of about 1,300 companies with more than 130,000 employees in 2010, which generated a revenue of 28 billion Euro. Almost 44 percent of the products are exported. The textile branch thus is the second largest producer of consumer goods after food production in the country. Berlin is the center of young and creative fashion in Germany, prominently displayed at Berlin Fashion Week (twice a year). It also hosts Europe's largest fashion trade fair called Bread & Butter.

Munich, Hamburg and Düsseldorf are also important design and production hubs of the German fashion industry, among smaller towns. Renowned fashion designers from Germany include Karl Lagerfeld, Jil Sander, Wolfgang Joop, Philipp Plein and Michael Michalsky. Important brands include Hugo Boss, Escada and Triumph, as well as special outfitters like Adidas, PUMA and Jack Wolfskin. The German supermodels Claudia Schiffer, Heidi Klum, Tatjana Patitz and Nadja Auermann came to global fame.

== Cuisine ==
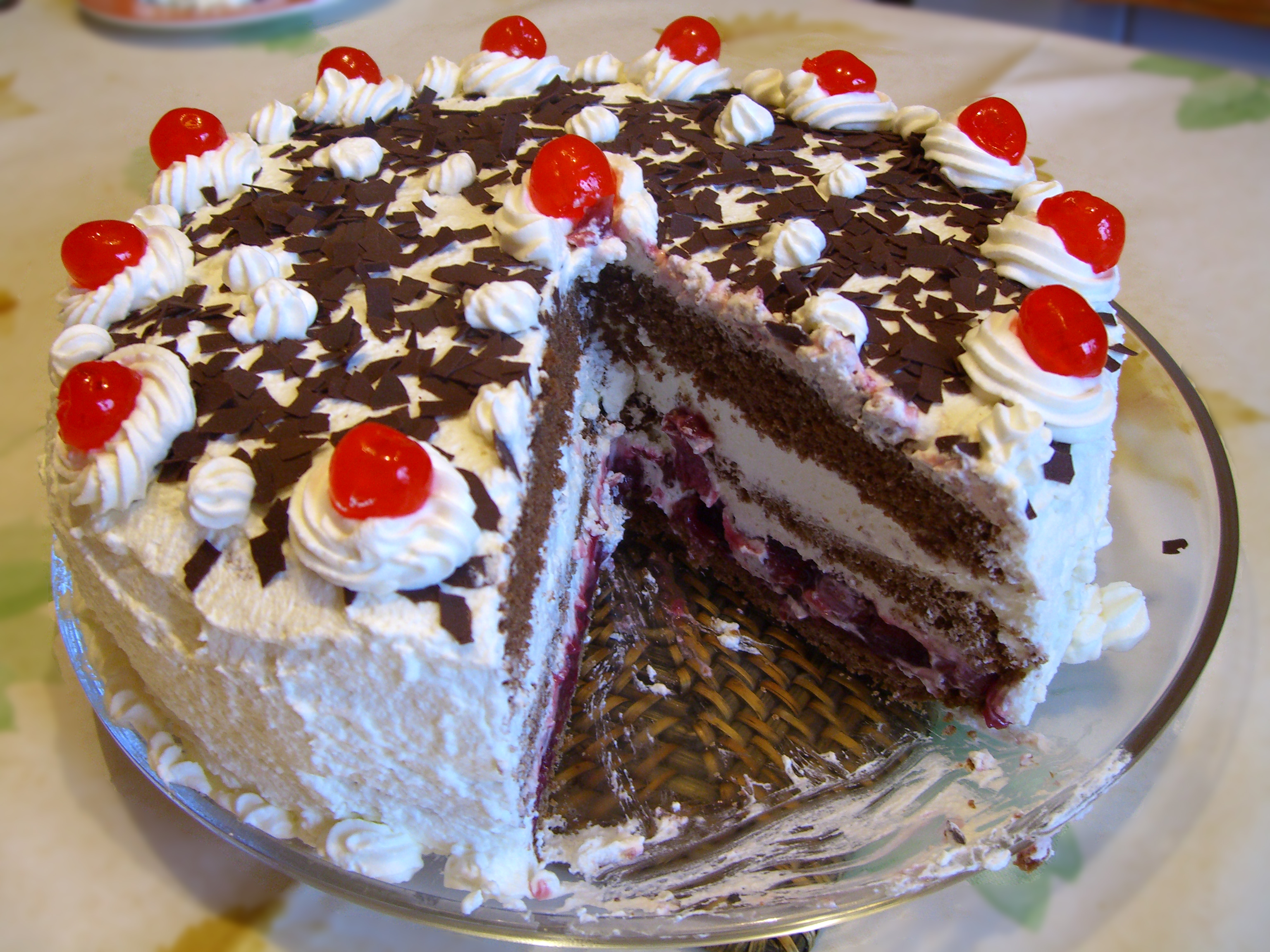
A Schwarzwälder Kirschtorte (Black Forest cake)

German cuisine varies from region to region. The southern regions of Bavaria and Swabia, for instance, share a culinary culture with Switzerland and Austria, like the Schnitzel. Pork, beef, and poultry are the main varieties of meat consumed in Germany; pork is the most popular. Throughout all regions, meat is often eaten in sausage form. More than 1,500 different types of sausage are produced in Germany. Organic food has gained a market share of almost 6%, and this is predicted to increase further.

A popular German saying has the meaning: "Breakfast like an emperor, lunch like a king, and dine like a beggar." Breakfast is usually a selection of breads and rolls with jam and honey or cold cuts and cheese, sometimes accompanied by a boiled egg. Cereals or muesli with milk or yoghurt is less common but widespread. More than 3000 types of bread are sold in bakery shops across the country. Occasionally, more traditional and heartier Breakfasts, like the Bavarian "Brotzeit" with Weisswurst, Sweet Mustard and Wheat beer, or the Bauernfrühstück are also popular.

It is customary for Germans to have a very large lunch around noon. A typical lunch usually consists of some type of meat or fish, a heavy carb such as potato or German noodles, and a side of vegetables. Due to the increasing number of Germans who work in urban centers, however, many more people are eating simple items on-the-go for lunch such as Currywurst, a go-to quick meal to pick up that consists of small pieces of sausage, french fries, and a spicy ketchup sauce.

The term for dinner in German is Abendbrot which directly translates to "evening bread". As the name suggests, typically Germans will have a lighter dinner that consists of sliced meat, sausages, bread, and cheeses. Also, most dinners eaten by Germans usually include some form of mustard and pickles. The habit of having a simple, light dinner has become less of an everyday routine for many Germans. Due to the increasing number of people who work all day, it is difficult for many Germans to make the time to have a large lunch. For this reason, larger dinners have become more common. Although, most families still have Abendbrot at least a few times a week.

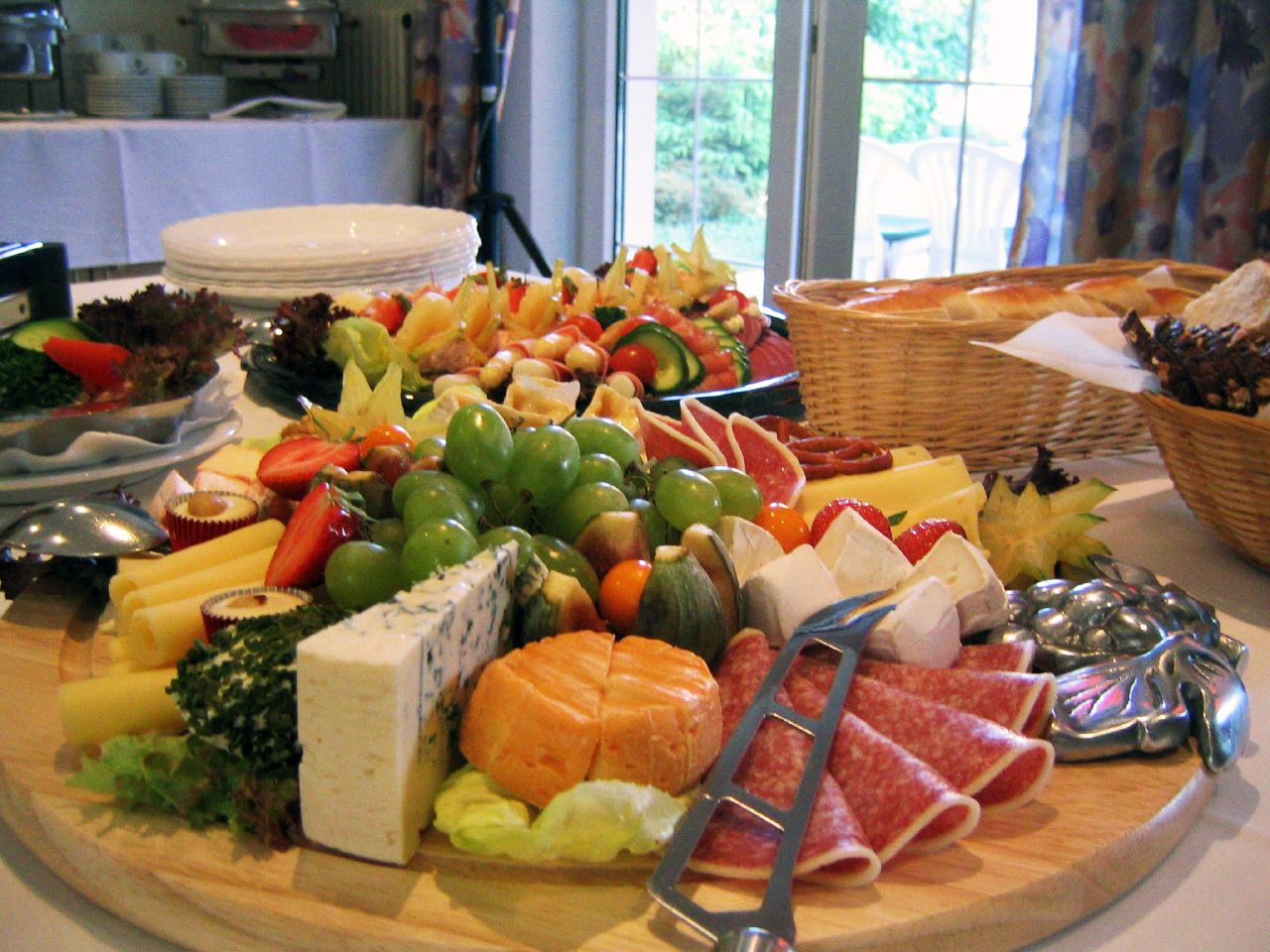
A typical cheese and cold meat buffet served at private festivities

As a country with many immigrants, Germany has adopted many international dishes into its cuisine and daily eating habits. Italian dishes like pizza and pasta, Turkish and Arab dishes like döner kebab and falafel, are well established, especially in bigger cities. International burger chains, as well as Chinese and Greek restaurants, are widespread. Indian, Thai, Japanese, and other Asian cuisines have gained popularity in recent decades. Among high-profile restaurants in Germany, the Michelin guide has awarded ten restaurants three stars, the highest designation, while 38 more received two stars and 255 one star. German restaurants have become the world's second most decorated eateries after France.

Although German wine is becoming more popular in many parts of Germany, the national alcoholic drink is beer. In over 1.500 breweries more than 5.000 types of beer are produced. German beer consumption per person is declining but—at 116 litres annually—it is still among the highest in the world. Beer varieties include Alt, Bock, Dunkel, Kölsch, Lager, Malzbier, Pils, and Weizenbier. Among 18 surveyed western countries, Germany ranked 14th in the list of per capita consumption of soft drinks in general, while it ranked third in the consumption of fruit juices. Furthermore, carbonated mineral water and Schorle (its mixture with fruit juice or wine) are very popular in Germany.

== Gaming ==
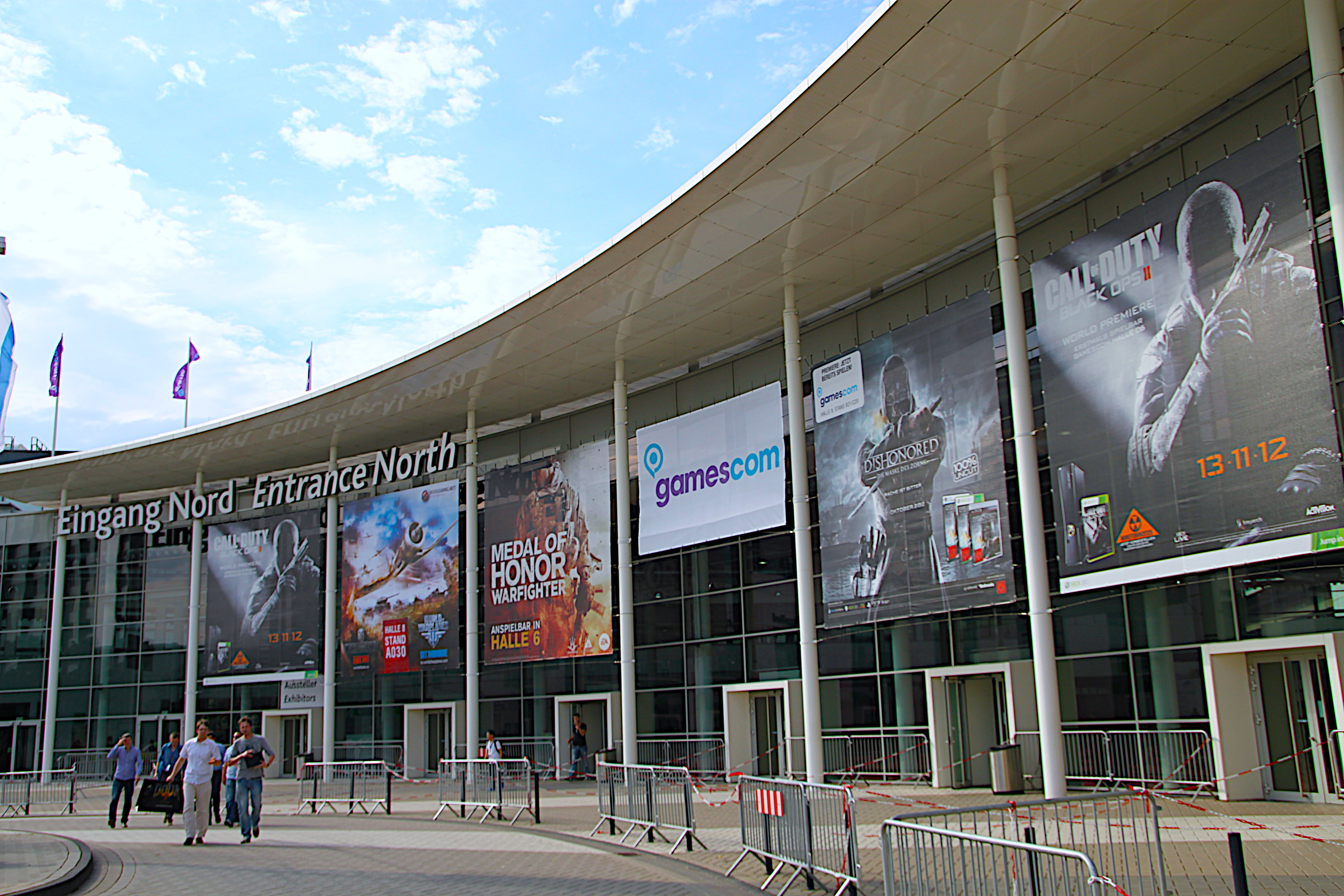
The Gamescom in Cologne is the world's largest gaming event, with 370,000 visitors and 1,037 exhibitors from 56 countries attending the event in 2018.

Germany is filled with inventors of board games, also known as Eurogames, that are played around the world. Popular games include The Settlers of Catan, which features hexagonal resource tiles that generate resources according to the roll of two dice, and Carcassonne with its randomly drawn square tiles that eventually make a medieval map and its notability for its meeples. The fervor for new games continued with Puerto Rico, Ticket to Ride, and Alhambra. In 2008, Germany imported the popular card game Dominion from the US. Today, Germany publishes more board games than any other country per capita.

The German video gaming market is one of the largest in the world. The Gamescom in Cologne is the world's leading gaming convention. Popular game series from Germany include Turrican, the Anno series, The Settlers series, the Gothic series, SpellForce, the X series, the FIFA Manager series, Far Cry and Crysis. The most relevant game developers and publishers are Blue Byte, Crytek, Deck13, Deep Silver, Daedalic Entertainment, Egosoft, Kalypso Media, Koch Media, Piranha Bytes, Related Designs and Yager Development. Bigpoint, Gameforge, Goodgame, Quake III Arena / Defrag and Wooga are leading developers of online and social games.

== Sports ==
Sport forms an integral part of German life. 27,000,000 Germans are members of a sports club and an additional 12,000,000 pursue such an activity individually. Association football is the most popular sport. With more than 6,300,000 official members, the German Football Association (Deutscher Fußball-Bund) is the largest sports organisation of its kind worldwide. The Bundesliga attracts the second-highest average attendance of any professional sports league in the world. The Germany national football team won the FIFA World Cup in 1954, 1974, 1990 and 2014 and the UEFA European Football Championship in 1972, 1980 and 1996. Germany has hosted the FIFA World Cup in 1974 and 2006 and the UEFA European Football Championship in 1988. Amongst the most successful and renowned footballers are: Franz Beckenbauer, Gerd Müller, Jürgen Klinsmann, Lothar Matthäus, and Oliver Kahn. Other popular spectator sports include handball, volleyball, basketball, ice hockey, and tennis.

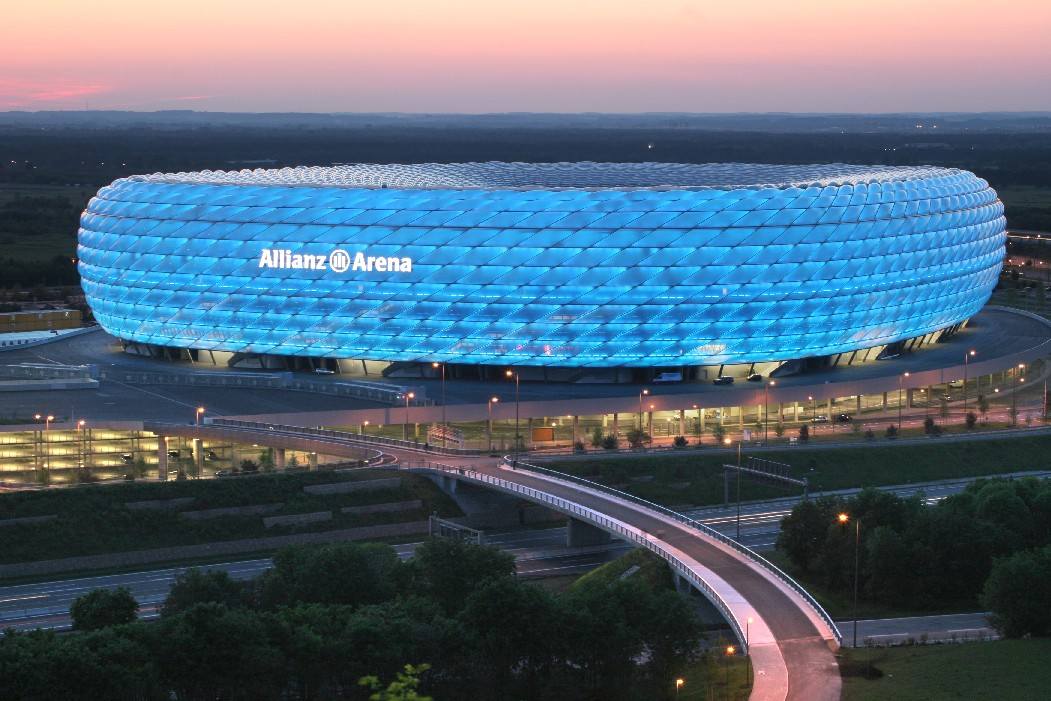
The Allianz Arena is home to the football club Bayern Munich and was venue for the 2006 FIFA World Cup and UEFA Euro 2024 opening games.

Germany is one of the leading motorsports countries in the world. Race-winning cars, teams and drivers have come from Germany. One of the most successful Formula One drivers in history, Michael Schumacher, set many significant motorsport records during his career, winning seven Formula One World Drivers' Championships and 91 Formula One race wins, making him the most gilded driver since Formula One's debut season in 1950. He is one of the highest paid sportsmen in history and became a billionaire athlete. Sebastian Vettel, another German Formula One pilot, later became the youngest Formula One World Champion in history and went on to win four consecutive world championship titles. He still holds records for the highest number of consecutive race wins and most pole positions in a single season. Constructors like BMW and Mercedes are among the leading manufacturers in motorsport. Additionally, Porsche has won the 24 Hours of Le Mans, a prestigious annual endurance race held in France, 16 times, and Audi has won it 9 times. The Deutsche Tourenwagen Masters is a popular series in Germany.

Historically, German sportsmen have been some of the most successful contenders in the Olympic Games, ranking third in an all-time Olympic Games medal count, combining East and West German medals. In the 2016 Summer Olympics, Germany finished fifth in the medal count, while in the 2018 Winter Olympics they finished second. Germany has hosted the Summer Olympic Games twice, in Berlin in 1936 and in Munich in 1972. The Winter Olympic Games took place in Germany once in 1936 when they were staged in the Bavarian twin towns of Garmisch and Partenkirchen.

== Society ==
Cultural map of the world according to the World Values Survey, describing Germany as high in "Rational-Secular Values" and low in "Self Expression Values"

Germany is a modern, advanced society, shaped by a plurality of lifestyles and regional identities. The country has established a high level of gender equality, promotes disability rights, and is legally and socially tolerant towards homosexuals. Gays and lesbians can legally adopt their partner's biological children, and same-sex marriage has been permitted since 2017. The former Foreign minister Guido Westerwelle and the former mayor of Berlin, Klaus Wowereit, are openly gay.

During the last decade of the twentieth century, Germany's attitude towards immigrants changed. Until the mid-1990s, the opinion was widespread that Germany was not a country of immigration, even though about 20% of the population were of non-German origin. Today the government and a majority of the German society are acknowledging that immigrants from diverse ethnocultural backgrounds are part of German society and that controlled immigration should be initiated based on qualification standards.

Since the 2006 FIFA World Cup, the internal and external evaluation of Germany's national image has changed. In the annual Nation Brands Index global survey, Germany became significantly and repeatedly more highly ranked after the tournament. People in 20 different states assessed the country's reputation in terms of culture, politics, exports, its people and its attractiveness to tourists, immigrants and investments. Germany has been named the world's second most valued nation among 50 countries in 2010. Another global opinion poll, for the BBC, revealed that Germany is recognised for the most positive influence in the world in 2010. A majority of 59% have a positive view of the country, while 14% have a negative view.

With an expenditure of €67 billion on international travel in 2008, Germans spent more money on travel than any other country. The most visited destinations were Spain, Italy and Austria. Additionally, tourism analysts estimate that over 65 percent of Germans vacationed for 5 or more days in 2007. The large amount of travel that Germans partake in can also be attributed to the amount of vacation days they receive. In Germany, employees are given a minimum of 24 vacation days annually, but often employers will give between 25 and 30 paid vacation days. Germans also like packaged vacations which can be all-inclusive vacations or pre-booked excursions or reservations. In 2018, 43% of all German travel consisted of packaged vacations.

== Leisure ==
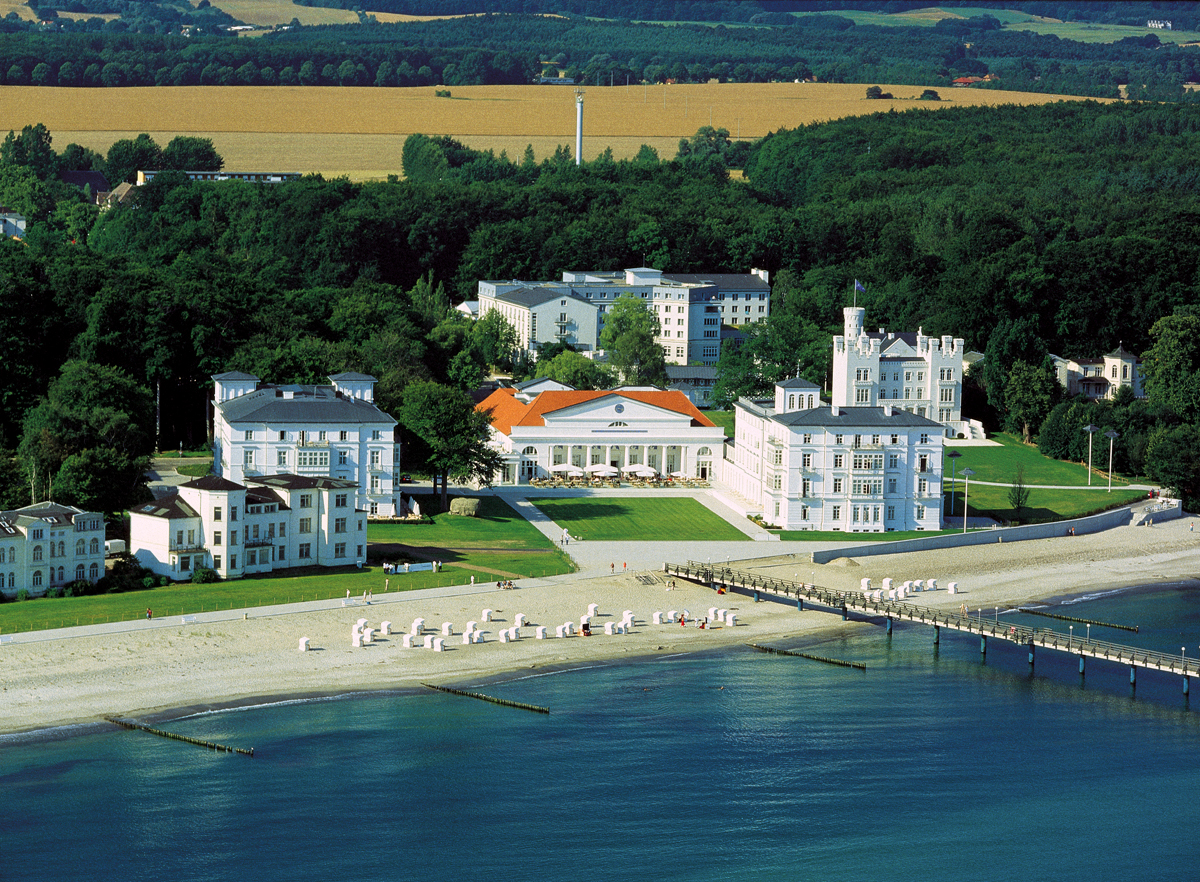
Mecklenburg-Vorpommern with its beaches at the Baltic Sea has many seside resorts, like the pictured Grand Hotel Heiligendamm, built between 1793 and 1870

In Germany, leisure is considered a quintessential part of the culture. Researchers in Hamburg concluded that Germans over 14 years old have an average of 4 hours of leisure time per day. Regardless of many factors that differentiate Germans, across the board, the most popular leisure activity is watching television. Most Germans dedicate their Sundays to leisure activity because a majority of shops and restaurants are closed on Sundays.

Sports clubs are a large part of Germans' leisure time. Currently, around 26 million people in Germany make up the membership to the over 91,000 sports clubs in Germany. Sports clubs can aid children and adults in getting to know people in their community through a shared passion for sports.

Another leisure activity that Germans like to partake in is exercise. Studies show that most Germans work out at least once a week in their free time. Additionally, Germany is notable for its longstanding tradition of Freikörperkultur (FKK), or free body culture, which advocates for the public health benefits of full-body exposure to natural elements—such as sunlight, fresh air, and outdoor exercise—as part of a holistic lifestyle. In practice, this is customarily expressed through non-sexual social nudity in outdoor spaces—whether formally designated or culturally accepted—by individuals and families at lakes, beaches, parks, and natural settings for naturist recreation. Rooted in late 19th- and early 20th-century health reform movements, such as the Lebensreform, FKK promotes regular sun and air exposure—often coupled with outdoor exercise—and regards these practices as beneficial to physical and mental well-being, alongside values of naturalism and body positivity. Although distinct from FKK ideology, nudity is also customary in German sauna culture, where mixed-gender facilities require textile-free participation for reasons of wellness and hygiene.

== See also ==
- German Forest
- Goethe-Institut
- Prussian virtues
- Public holidays in Germany
- German folklore
- Weihnachten
- Oktoberfest
- List of museums in Germany
