= Augsburg Peace Festival =

Protestant holiday celebrated yearly on 8 August

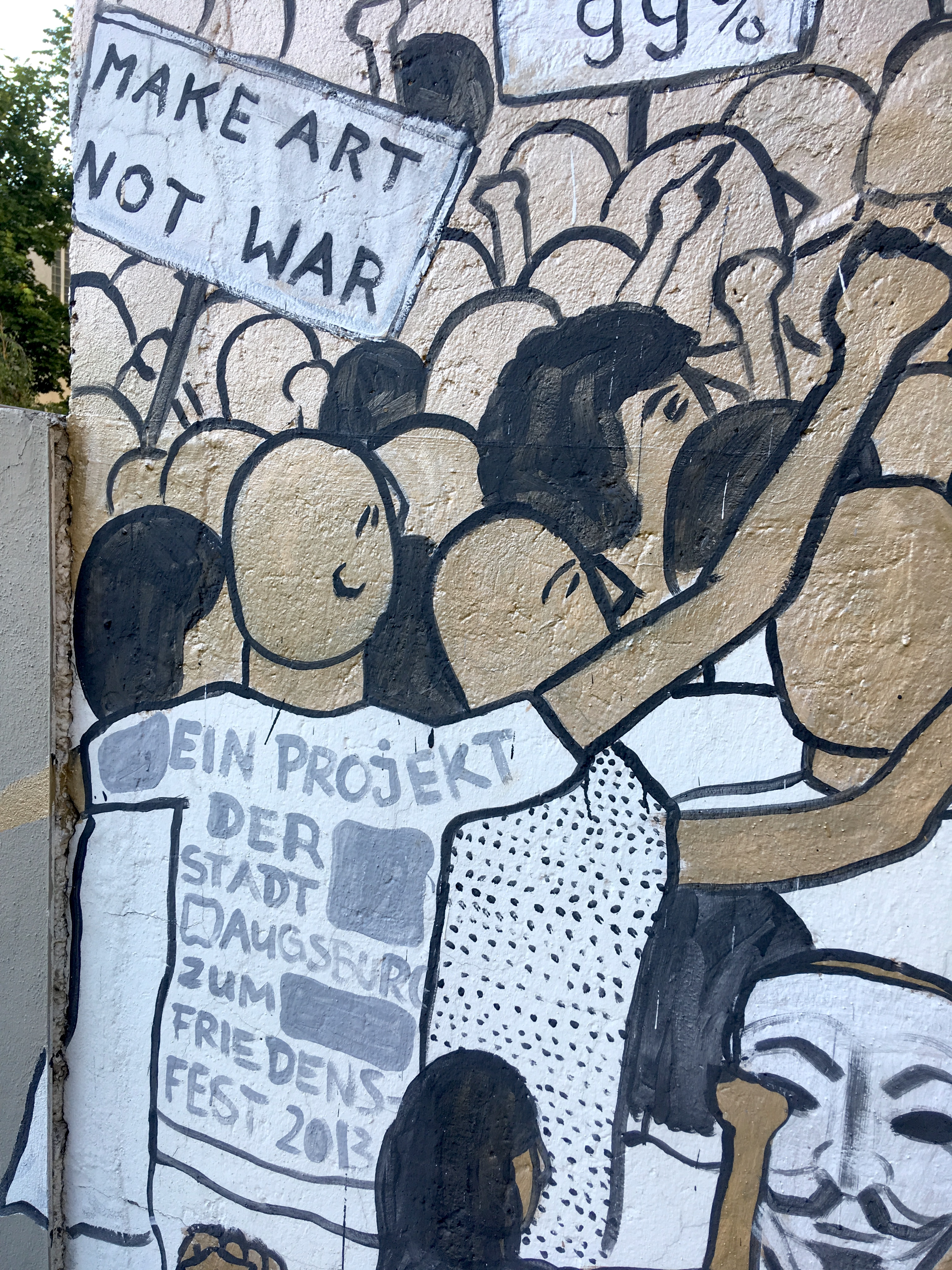
Every year murals are made for the Peace Festival.

The Augsburg Peace Festival has been celebrated yearly on 8 August since 1650. The Augsburg Protestants originally celebrated the end of the Recatholicisation measures during the Thirty Years' War, which was initiated by the Peace of Westphalia in 1648. Today the Peace Festival is a public holiday limited to the Augsburg city area, making Augsburg the city with the most public holidays in Germany. In 2018, the Peace Festival was included in the nationwide register of intangible cultural heritage by the German UNESCO Commission.

== History ==
During the Reformation, the Lutheran Confessio Augustana, proclaimed at the Reichstag in 1530, gained a majority in Augsburg. The imperial city joined the Schmalkaldic League in 1536. However, its defeat in the Schmalkaldic War weakened the Protestant majority, so that Augsburg introduced a parity government and administrative system (equal rights and exact distribution of offices between Catholics and Protestants) in its city constitution of 1548. The city was able to consolidate this special position within the Holy Roman Empire in 1555 with the Peace of Augsburg.

However, this religious equality was jeopardised in 1618 with the outbreak of the Thirty Years' War. In fact, Recatholicisation measures began on August 8, 1629, on the basis of Emperor Ferdinand II's edict of restitution. The edict, which had already been passed in March of the same year, was initially not implemented in the city, which prompted the emperor to take tougher measures. On August 8, Augsburg Protestants were banned from practicing their faith. In 1632 the city was taken by Protestant Swedish troops and recaptured by imperial and Bavarian troops in 1635. At the end of the Thirty Years' War in 1648, parity was restored in Augsburg with the Peace of Westphalia and Augsburg became a free imperial city. Two years later, the Augsburg Protestants took the anniversary of the imperial intervention in 1629 as an opportunity to celebrate the preservation of their faith with the first Peace Festival.

As early as 1651, the custom of presenting so-called peace paintings to school children for the festival was developed. The tradition began with printed prayers decorated with small engravings, but soon these became sheets in folio format, with an engraving in the upper half and underneath a text that explained the content of the image in rhymed form, often with a polemical tendency. These are predominantly scenes from the Bible, but there are also motifs from Protestant church history. A series of 138 graphic sheets dating back to 1789 has been preserved, which are unique in this form.

== The Peace Festival today ==
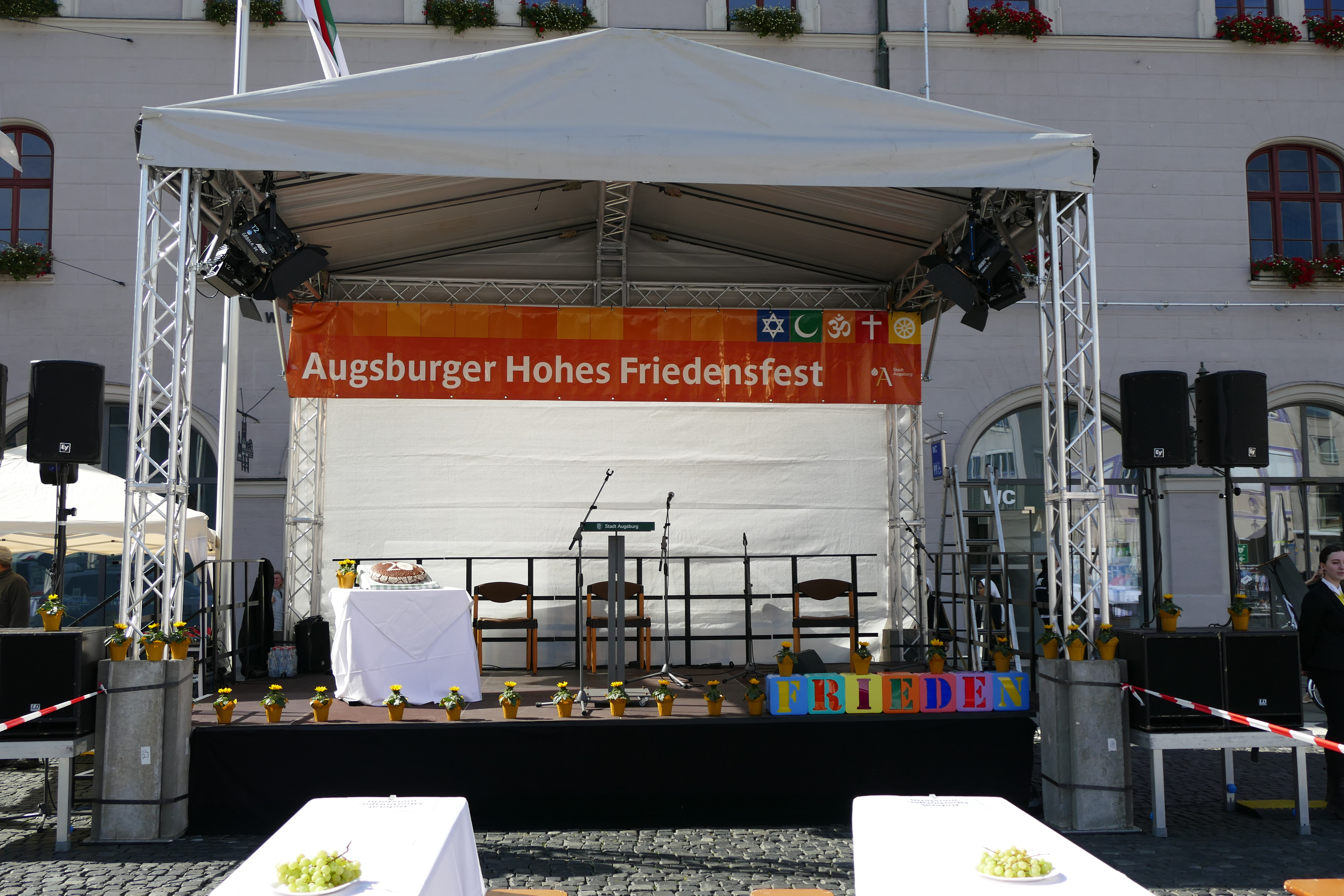
Stage at the Table of Peace 2023

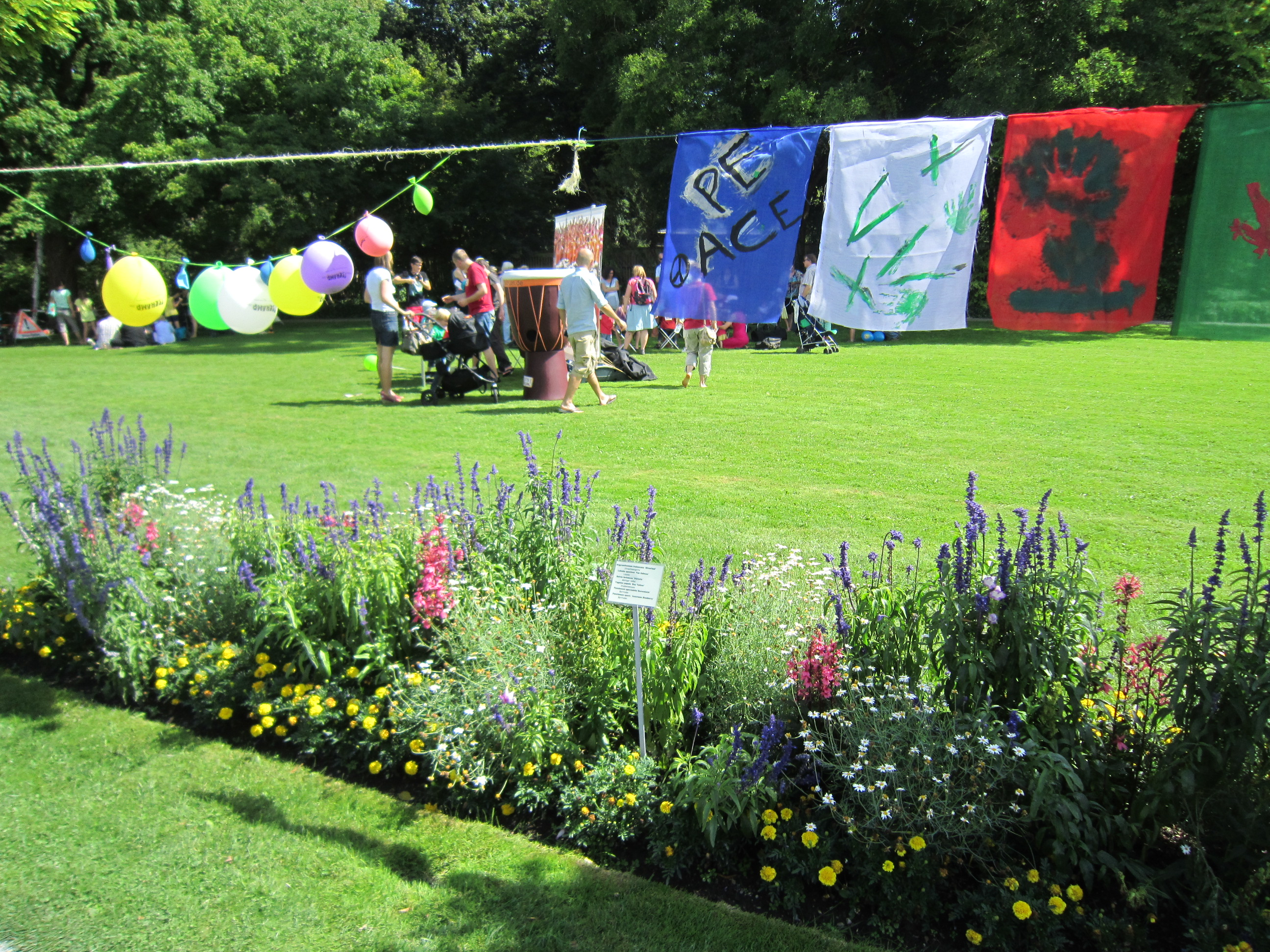
Children's Peace Festival in Botanical Garden

The Catholic Church has also officially celebrated Peace Day since 1984. Since 1985, the city of Augsburg has awarded the Augsburg Peace Prize every three years. The winner will be announced on August 8.

In the 1970s, the tradition of the “peace picture” was revived - every year an, ecumenical jury chooses a child's picture as the official peace picture. Themes of the peace pictures in recent years have been:

- 2012: It's fine the way it is …
- 2013: Chaos everywhere—one with myself?
- 2014: Where God is at home
- 2015: This goes too far! – This doesn’t go far enough!
- 2016: Courageous!
- 2017: I stand by it!
- 2018: Your kingdom come …
- 2019: I am so free! – Am I so free?
- 2020: Again and again …
- 2021: Do you care? About whom, about what, and how?
- 2022: Let’s stand together!
- 2023: Peace is colourful!
- 2024: Just listen!

When the U.S. garrison in Augsburg still had American soldiers stationed there, a concert featuring German and American military bands was held every year on the evening of August 8, concluding with a grand fireworks display at the Rosenaustadion.

In 2005, Augsburg linked the holiday with celebrations marking the 450th anniversary of the Peace of Augsburg of 1555, the first treaty that allowed different confessions to coexist and treated them equally.

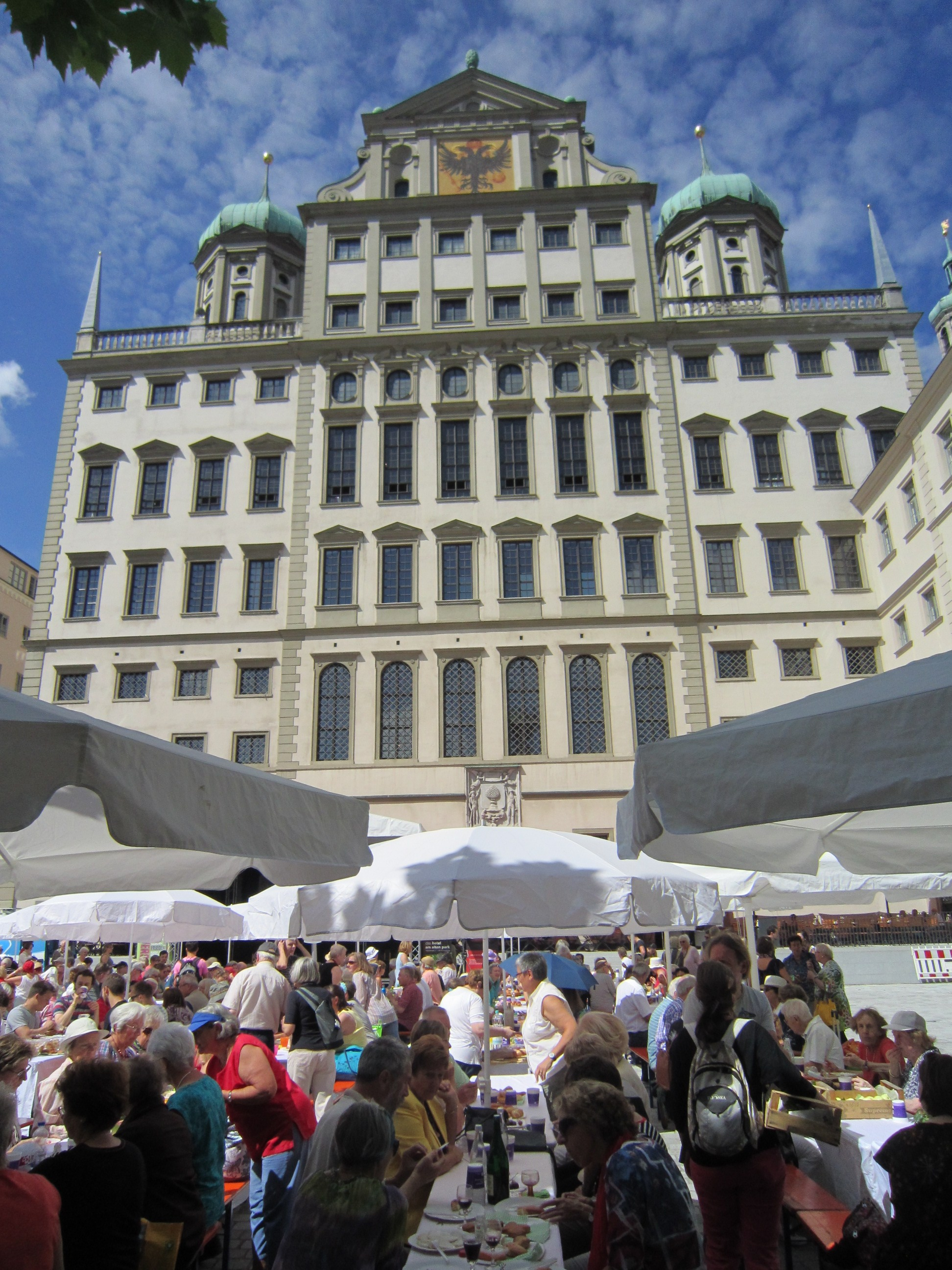
Table of Peace at the town hall

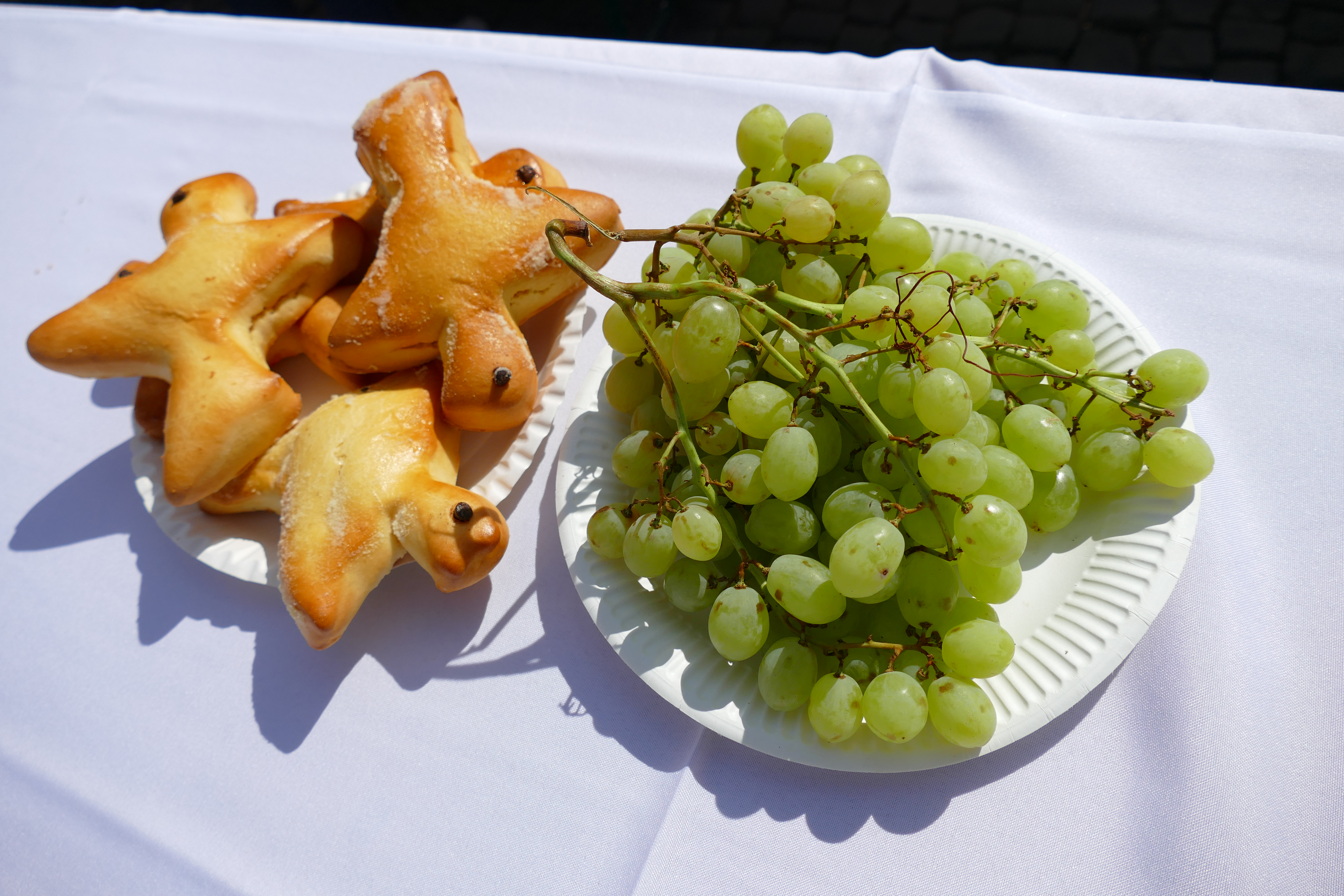
Baked peace doves and grapes at the Table of Peace 2023

Since 2005, the Augsburg Round Table of Religions has organised the multi-month event series "Pax," which focuses on issues of intercultural coexistence and interreligious dialogue. Every two to three years, a historical citizens' festival is held from the end of July/early August until the Peace Festival. The actual Peace Festival on August 8 forms the central and highlight of the series with a variety of events and activities.

Recurring events include the "Table of Peace" at Augsburg's Town Hall Square (or Elias-Holl Square), the ecumenical opening service, and the peace messages from the religious communities of Augsburg. A "Children's Peace Festival" takes place at the zoo and the nearby Botanical Garden.

== Exhibitions ==
- 2015/2016: A Long Way to Peace. Augsburg Peace Paintings 1650–1789. Graphic Cabinet, Art Collections & Museums Augsburg.

== Literature ==
- Ulrike Albrecht: The Augsburg Peace Paintings 1651–1789. An Investigation into the Evangelical-Lutheran Teaching Image of a Free Imperial City. Diss. Munich 1983, II, 107.
- Johannes Burkhardt (Ed.): The Peace Festival. Augsburg and the Development of a Modern Tolerance, Peace, and Festival Culture (= Colloquia Augustana, 13). Akademie-Verlag, Berlin 2000, ISBN 3-05-003540-4
- Claire Gantet: A Quite Holy Festival – The Augsburg Peace Festival and the Fruits of Secular and Religious Peace. In: Carl A. Hoffmann (et al., Eds.): When Peace Was Possible – 450 Years of the Augsburg Religious Peace. Schnell & Steiner, Regensburg 2005, ISBN 3-7954-1748-1
- Helmut Gier: Peace Paintings of the Augsburg High Peace Festival. In: Carl A. Hoffmann (et al., Eds.): When Peace Was Possible – 450 Years of the Augsburg Religious Peace. Schnell & Steiner, Regensburg 2005, ISBN 3-7954-1748-1
- Horst Jesse: Peace Paintings 1650–1789 for the High Peace Festival on August 8 in Augsburg. Ludwig, Pfaffenhofen/Ilm 1981, ISBN 3-7787-3179-3
