= Botanischer Garten Augsburg =

Botanical garden in Bavaria, Germany

Coordinates: 48°21′00″N 10°54′53″E

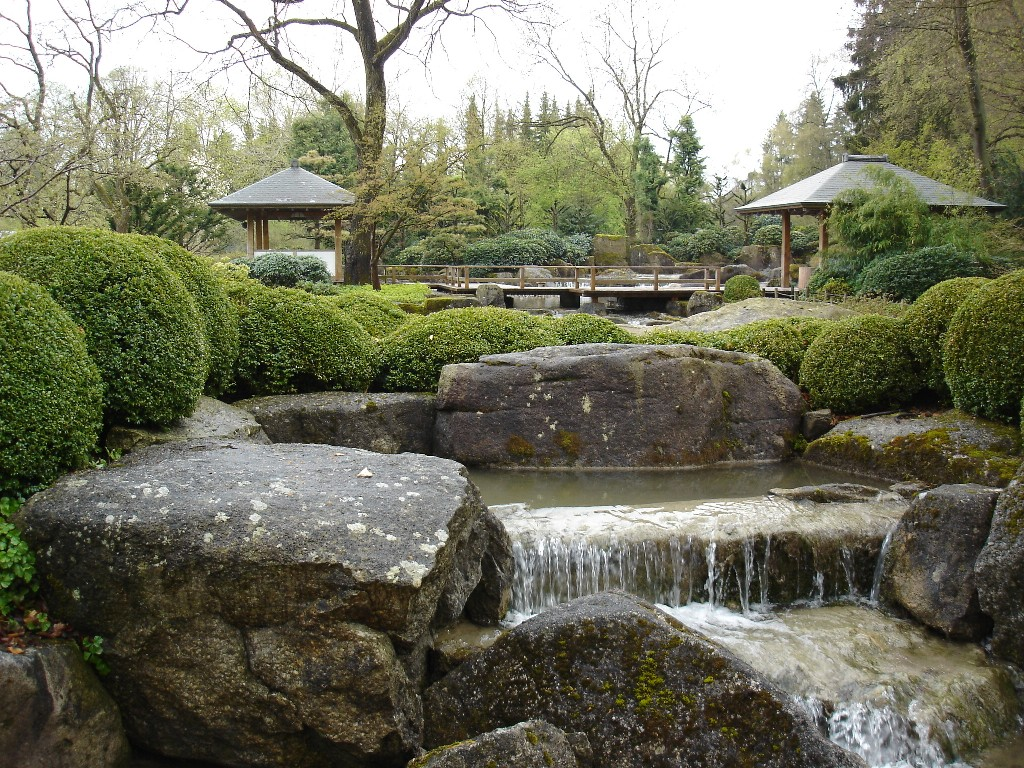
Botanischer Garten Augsburg

The Botanischer Garten Augsburg (10 hectares/24.7 acres) is a municipal botanical garden located at Dr.-Ziegenspeck-Weg 10, Augsburg, Bavaria, Germany. It is open daily; an admission fee is charged.

Today the garden contains a large Japanese garden, a medicinal plant garden, rose garden, and a crop garden. All told, it includes over 3100 species and varieties of perennials, wild herbs, grasses, and ferns, with 280 species and varieties of roses, about 1200 species and varieties of plants under glass, and more than one million onion plants. Other points of interest include cacti, euphorbia, and succulents, as well as a sage garden and climbing plants.

== See also ==
- List of botanical gardens in Germany
