= Public holidays in Germany =

Public holidays in Germany can be declared by law either by the Federal German authorities or by the Länder for their respective jurisdictions. The constitution requires that there must be some public holidays. At present the only federal holiday is German Unity Day (Unity Treaty, Art. 2 sect. 2); all the other holidays, even those celebrated all over Germany, are prescribed by state legislation.

By law, "the Sundays and the public holidays remain protected as days of rest from work and of spiritual elevation" (Art. 139 WRV, part of the German constitution via Art. 140 GG). Thus all Sundays are, in a manner, public holidays, but they are not usually recognised within the term "holiday" (except for, normally, Easter Sunday and Pentecost Sunday).

== List by state ==
Name of holiday		Date	Federal state															
English	German	Date	(Baden-Württemberg) BW	(Bavaria) BY	(Berlin) BE	(Brandenburg) BB	(Bremen (state)) HB	(Hamburg) HH	(Hesse) HE	(Mecklenburg-Vorpommern) MV	(Lower Saxony) NI	(North Rhine-Westphalia) NW	(Rhineland-Palatinate) RP	(Saarland) SL	(Saxony) SN	(Saxony-Anhalt) ST	(Schleswig-Holstein) SH	(Thuringia) TH
New Year's Day	Neujahrstag	1 January	✔	✔	✔	✔	✔	✔	✔	✔	✔	✔	✔	✔	✔	✔	✔	✔
Epiphany	Heilige Drei Könige	6 January	✔	✔												✔		
International Women's Day	Internationaler Frauentag	8 March			✔					✔								
Good Friday	Karfreitag	Easter Sunday − 2d	✔	✔	✔	✔	✔	✔	✔	✔	✔	✔	✔	✔	✔	✔	✔	✔
Easter Monday	Ostermontag	Easter Sunday + 1d	✔	✔	✔	✔	✔	✔	✔	✔	✔	✔	✔	✔	✔	✔	✔	✔
Labour Day	Tag der Arbeit	1 May	✔	✔	✔	✔	✔	✔	✔	✔	✔	✔	✔	✔	✔	✔	✔	✔
Ascension Day	Christi Himmelfahrt	Easter Sunday + 39d	✔	✔	✔	✔	✔	✔	✔	✔	✔	✔	✔	✔	✔	✔	✔	✔
Whit Monday	Pfingstmontag	Easter Sunday + 50d	✔	✔	✔	✔	✔	✔	✔	✔	✔	✔	✔	✔	✔	✔	✔	✔
Corpus Christi	Fronleichnam	Easter Sunday + 60d	✔	✔					✔			✔	✔	✔	(Note: Public holiday only in few Sorbian communities.)			(Note: Public holiday only in the Catholic district of Eichsfeld.)
Augsburg Peace Festival	Augsburger Hohes Friedensfest	8 August		(Note: Public holiday only in the city of Augsburg.)														
Assumption Day	Mariä Himmelfahrt	15 August		✔ (Note: Public holiday only in approx. 1700 communities with predominantly Catholic population and in the cities of Augsburg and Munich.) (Note: Schools are closed all over the state on that day.)										✔				
World Children's Day	Weltkindertag	20 September																✔ (Note: From 2019 onwards.)
German Unity Day	Tag der Deutschen Einheit	3 October	✔	✔	✔	✔	✔	✔	✔	✔	✔	✔	✔	✔	✔	✔	✔	✔
Reformation Day (Note: One-time public holiday in all states, including those not normally observing Reformation Day, to mark the 500th anniversary of the Reformation in 2017.)	Reformationstag	31 October				✔	✔ (Note: Four states adopted the Reformation Day as permanent holiday starting in 2018 (Bremen, Hamburg, Lower Saxony and Schleswig-Holstein (see table for references)).)	✔		✔	✔				✔	✔	✔	✔
All Saints' Day	Allerheiligen	1 November	✔	✔								✔	✔	✔				
Day of Prayer and Repentance (Note: Public holiday in all states until 1994. The holiday was discontinued with introduction of nursing care insurance. Saxony is the only state where employers do not have to pay for nursing care insurance (paid by employees in that state) and where the holiday is still kept.)	Buß- und Bettag	Wednesday before Totensonntag i.e. Advent Sunday − 11d													✔			
Christmas Day	Weihnachtstag	25 December	✔	✔	✔	✔	✔	✔	✔	✔	✔	✔	✔	✔	✔	✔	✔	✔
Second Day of Christmas	Zweiter Weihnachtsfeiertag	26 December	✔	✔	✔	✔	✔	✔	✔	✔	✔	✔	✔	✔	✔	✔	✔	✔
Total number of holidays per state (Note: For states where some holidays are not observed uniformly all over the state, such holidays are included in the state's total number of holidays if their celebration is predominant and widespread in that state: Bavaria: with Assumption Day, without Peace Festival.; Saxony and Thuringia: without Corpus Christi.)			12	13	10	10	10	10	10	11	10	11	11	12	11	11	10	11

=== Notes ===
✔ – Public holiday is celebrated in that state.

In addition, the state of Brandenburg formally declared Easter Sunday and Pentecost Sunday as public holidays. As these are Sundays anyway, they have been left out by the other states, nor counted in the table above (the state of Hesse even declared all Sundays public holidays).

== Quiet days ==
A couple of days are designated as stille Tage ("quiet days") by state legislation, which regularly means that public dancing or sport events, music at inns (if live or if not much quieter than usual) etc. are prohibited.

Some public holidays or commemorations are quiet days:

- Ash Wednesday (in Bavaria)
- Holy Thursday (in some states; in some of them beginning in the evening)
- Good Friday
- Holy Saturday (in some states)
- Buß- und Bettag (where it is a public holiday and in a couple of other states)
- All Saints' Day (where it is a public holiday)
- All Souls' Day (in Lower Saxony and the Saarland)
- Volkstrauertag
- Totensonntag (the last Sunday of the Protestant liturgical year)
- Christmas Eve (beginning in the afternoon, in some states)

The status of quiet days is also given to festivities joyous in nature: in Hesse, the highest Christian holidays are half-quiet days (until midday) and in Rhineland-Palatinate, Easter Sunday and Christmas Day are two-thirds-quiet days (until 4 pm). For details, see the article Dancing ban.

== Flag days ==
A yet third category that may sometimes be called "holidays" in a sense are the "flag days" (Beflaggungstage). Only the very highest institutions and the military use the national flags at every day, so the directives when flags are to be displayed mark the days in question as special.

Flags are to be shown by Federal Decree on

- Holocaust Memorial Day (27 January, half-mast)
- Labour Day (1 May)
- Europe Day (9 May)
- Constitution Day (23 May)
- Popular Uprising Day (17 June) This day was public holiday under the title of "German Unity Day" from 1954 until 1990 when that unity actually was achieved.
- Resistance Day (20 July)
- German Unity Day (3 October)
- Memorial Day (half-mast) (two Sundays before the first Sunday of Advent)
- Election Day (Bundestag, European Parliament)

and by state decrees on other days, such as election days for state parliaments, state constitution days, anniversary of the election of the Federal President (in Berlin) and so forth.

Frequently flags are ordered ad hoc to be shown at half-mast in cases of national mourning.

== Unofficial holidays ==
Either Carnival Monday ("Rosenmontag") or Shrove Tuesday is a de facto holiday in some towns and cities in Catholic western and southern Germany which have a strong Carnival tradition.

Christmas Eve may sometimes be treated as a holiday. Most places will be closed in the afternoon, and many businesses and most schools will be closed the entire day.

April Fools' Day, while not a holiday in the traditional sense, is celebrated in Germany.

Oktoberfest is an annual two-week festival held in Munich, Germany during late September and early October. It is the largest folk festival in the world, though not a formally recognized holiday in any way.

== Customs about holidays ==
Ascension Day (Christi Himmelfahrt) and Corpus Christi (Fronleichnam) are both always on Thursdays. By taking only one day's leave, employees can have a four-day weekend.

The Three Kings Day, better known as Epiphany, is 6 January, the day after the 12 days of Christmas. In parts of Germany, it has its own local customs.

== Public holidays in the former German Democratic Republic (East Germany) ==
Holiday	Local name	Date	Remarks
New Year	Neujahr	1 January
Good Friday	Karfreitag	Easter Sunday – 2d
Easter Monday	Ostermontag	Easter Sunday + 1d	until 1967 and in 1990
Labour Day	Internationaler Kampf- und Feiertag der Werktätigen für Frieden und Sozialismus	1 May
Liberation Day	Tag der Befreiung	8 May	until 1967 and in 1985
Victory Day	Tag des Sieges	9 May	only in 1975
Ascension Day	Christi Himmelfahrt	Easter Sunday + 39d	until 1967 and in 1990
Whit Monday	Pfingstmontag	Easter Sunday + 50d
Day of the Republic	Tag der Republik	7 October
Reformation Day	Reformationstag	31 October	until 1966
Day of Repentance and Prayer	Buß- und Bettag	Wed. before 23 November	until 1966
Christmas Day	1. Weihnachtsfeiertag	25 December
St Stephen's Day / Boxing Day	2. Weihnachtsfeiertag	26 December

== See also ==
- Holidays in Nazi Germany
