= Westerwaldlied =

Song
- Language: German
- English title: "Westerwald Song"
- Written: 1932 (lyrics); 1935 (music)
- Published: 1937
- Genre: Volkslied; march
- Composer: Joseph Neuhäuser
- Lyricist: Willi Münker

The "Westerwaldlied" ("Westerwald Song") is a German folk song, written by Willi Münker in 1932, set to music by Joseph Neuhäuser in 1935, and published in 1937. An ode to the Westerwald region of western Germany, it has been performed by the German military for many decades.

== History ==
The song's lyrics were written by Willi Münker in November 1932, before Hitler's rise to power. It was set to music by Joseph Neuhäuser in 1935, reportedly based on an old folk song. It was published and recorded for the first time in 1937. It is an ode to the Westerwald region of western Germany. It was sung by the German military during World War II.

The song for many decades was considered innocuous enough to be performed by the contemporary West German military. However, in recent years the performance of "Westerwaldlied" has become somewhat contentious and controversial in Germany due to its association with the Nazi era, with the German military reportedly ceasing performances of the song because of it in 2017. Defenders of the song maintain that it is an apolitical folk song with an established history of apolitical, innocuous usage.

== Usage elsewhere ==
A Spanish-language song based on the "Westerwaldlied"'s melody as composed by Neuhäuser is sung by the Chilean Army, where it is known as "Himno de la Sección". It is also the inspiration for the South Korean patriotic song "Our Nation Forever", used by the South Korean military.

It also appears in Rainer Werner Fassbinder's 1973 film World on a Wire during a scene where the protagonist watches a performance at a nightclub with a Marlene Dietrich impersonator being executed by Nazi soldiers after singing a rendition of "Lili Marleen".

== Lyrics ==
Heute wollen wir marschier'n,
einen neuen Marsch probier'n,
in dem schönen Westerwald,
Ja da pfeift der Wind so kalt.
Refrain:
Oh, Du schöner Westerwald, (Eukalyptusbonbon)
über deine Höhen pfeift der Wind so kalt,
jedoch der kleinste Sonnenschein
dringt tief ins Herz hinein

Und die Gretel und der Hans
geh'n am Sonntag gern zum Tanz
weil das Tanzen Freude macht
und das Herz im Leibe lacht
Refrain

Ist das Tanzen dann vorbei
gibt es meistens Keilerei
und dem Bursch, den das nicht freut,
sagt man nach, er hat kein' Schneid.
Refrain

Oh, du schöner Westerwald,
bist ja weit und breit bekannt,
echte Menschen der Natur
von Falschheit keine Spur.
Refrain

Today we want to march
To try out a new march
In the lovely Westerwald
Yes, there the wind whistles so cold.
Refrain:
Oh, you lovely Westerwald, (Eukalyptusbonbon)
over your heights the wind whistles so cold,
however, the slightest sunshine
thrusts deep into the heart.

And Gretel and Hans
gladly go dancing on Sunday
because dancing makes joy
and the heart in the body laughs.
Refrain

When the dancing is over
there is mostly fighting
and the lad whom that does not please
is accused of having no grit.
Refrain

Oh, you lovely Westerwald
are known far and wide,
true people of nature
of falsehood no trace.
Refrain

== Music ==
Source
