= Auld Lang Syne =

Robert Burns poem set to traditional melody

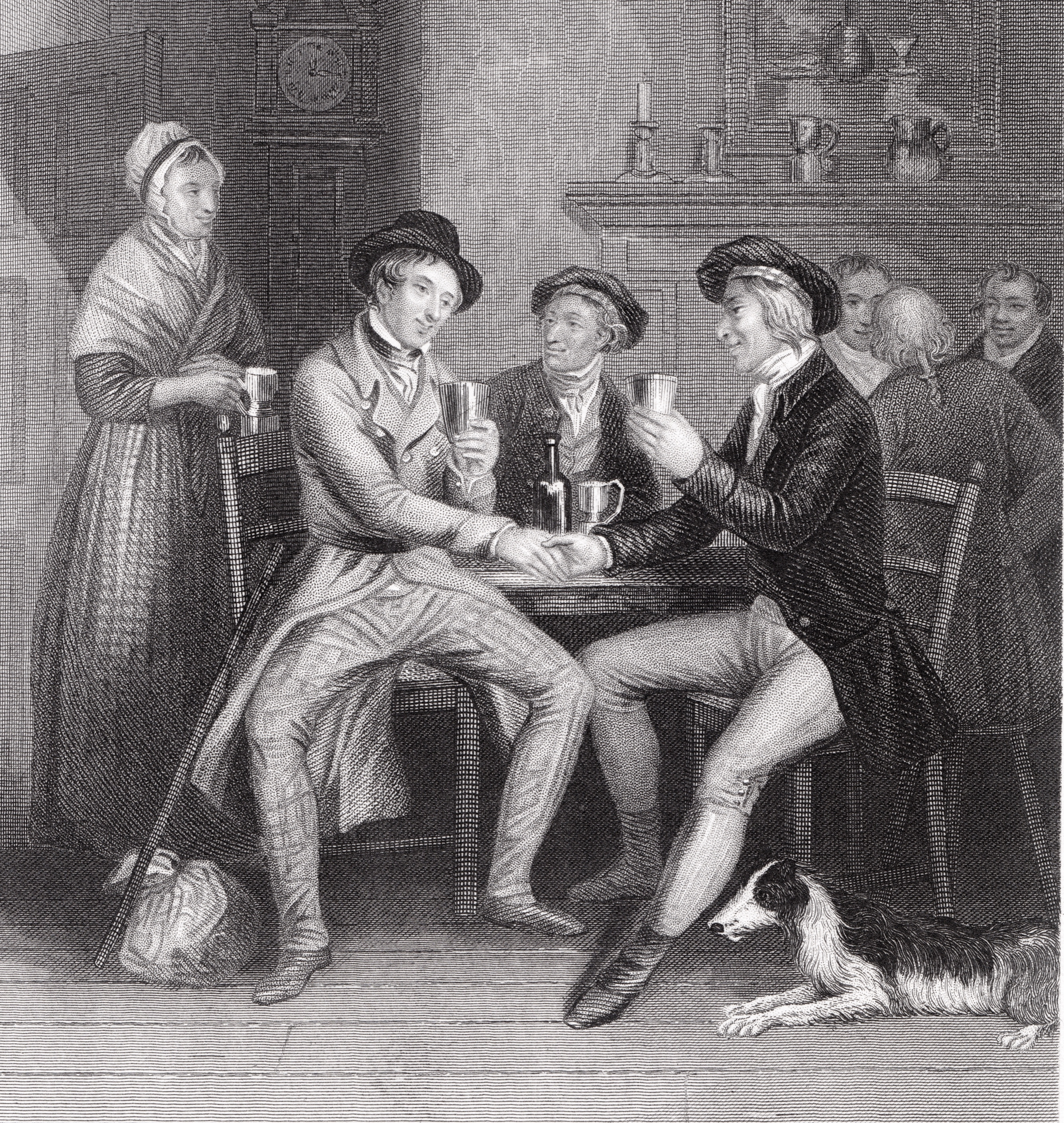
- John Masey Wright and John Rogers' illustration of the poem, c. 1841
- Text: Robert Burns
- Language: Scots
- Melody: traditional tune
- Published: 1799: Edinburgh by George Thomson

"Auld Lang Syne" (Scots: [ˈɔːl(d) lɑŋ ˈsəi̯n]) (Note: Note [s] rather than [z]) is a Scottish song. In the English-speaking world it is traditionally sung to bid farewell to the old year at the stroke of midnight on Hogmanay, or New Year's Eve. It is also often heard at funerals and graduations and as a farewell or ending to other occasions; for instance, many branches of the Scouting movement use it to close jamborees and other functions.

The text is a Scots-language poem written by Robert Burns in 1788, but it is based on an older Scottish folk song. In 1799 it was set to a traditional pentatonic tune, which has since become standard. "Auld Lang Syne" is listed as numbers 6294 and 13892 in the Roud Folk Song Index.

Its Scots title may be translated into standard English as "old long since" or, less literally, "long long ago", "days gone by", "times long past" or "old times". Consequently, "For auld lang syne", as it appears in the first line of the chorus, might be loosely translated as "for the sake of old times". The phrase auld lang syne is also used in similar poems by Robert Ayton (1570–1638), Allan Ramsay (1686–1757) and James Watson (1711), as well as older folk songs predating Burns.

== Lyrics ==
The song begins by posing a rhetorical question: Is it right for old times to be forgotten? The answer is generally interpreted as a call to remember long-standing friendships.

George Thomson's Select Songs of Scotland was published in 1799 in which the second verse about greeting and toasting was moved to its present position at the end.

Most common usage of the song involves only the first verse and the chorus while the rest is rarely sung for several reasons.

Burns's original Scots verse

Should auld acquaintance be forgot,
and never brought to mind?
Should auld acquaintance be forgot,
and auld lang syne?

Chorus:
For auld lang syne, my jo,
for auld lang syne,
we'll tak' a cup o' kindness yet,
for auld lang syne.

And surely ye'll be (Note: "Be" in this context means "to stand, be at the expense of".) your pint-stoup!
and surely I'll be mine!
And we'll tak' a cup o' kindness yet,
for auld lang syne.

Chorus

We twa hae run about the braes,
and pou'd the gowans fine;
But we've wander'd mony a weary fit,
sin' auld lang syne.

Chorus

We twa hae paidl'd in the burn,
frae morning sun till dine; (Note: dine = "dinner time")
But seas between us braid hae roar'd
sin' auld lang syne.

Chorus

And there's a hand, my trusty fiere!
and gie's a hand o' thine!
And we'll tak' a right gude-willie waught,
for auld lang syne.

Chorus

IPA pronunciation guide
(Burns's own Ayrshire dialect)

ʃɪd o̜ːld ə.kwɛn.təns bi fər.ɡot
ən nɪ.vər brɔxt tɪ məin
ʃɪd o̜ːld ə.kwɛn.təns bi fər.ɡot
ən o̜ːld lɑŋ səin

Chorus:
fər o̜ːld lɑŋ səin mɑ d͡ʒo
fər o̜ːld lɑŋ səin
wiːl tɑk ə kʌp o kəin.nəs jɛt
fər o̜ːld lɑŋ səin

ən ʃeːr.li jiːl bi juːr pəint.stʌup
ən ʃeːr.li ɑːl bi məin
ən wiːl tɑk ə kʌp o kəin.nəs jɛt
fər o̜ːld lɑŋ səin

Chorus

wi two̜̜ː heː rɪn ə.but ðə breːz
ən puːd ðə ɡʌu.ənz fəin
bʌt wiːv wo̜n.ərt mʌ.ne ə wiːrɪ fɪt
sɪn o̜ːld lɑŋ səin

Chorus

wi two̜̜ː heː pe.dlt ɪn ðə bʌrn
freː moːr.nɪn sɪn tɪl dəin
bʌt siːz ə.twin ʌs bred heː roːrd
sɪn o̜ːld lɑŋ səin

Chorus

ən ðeːrz ə ho̜ːn mɑ trʌs.tɪ fiːr
əŋ ɡiːz ə ho̜ːn o ðəin
ən wiːl tɑk ə rɪxt ɡɪd wʌ.lɪ wɑːxt
fər o̜ːld lɑŋ səin

Chorus

Standard English version

Should old acquaintance be forgot,
and never brought to mind?
Should old acquaintance be forgot,
and auld lang syne?

Chorus:
For auld lang syne, my dear,
for auld lang syne,
we'll take a cup of kindness yet,
for auld lang syne.

And surely you'll buy your pint cup!
and surely I'll buy mine!
And we'll take a cup of kindness yet,
for auld lang syne.

Chorus

We two have run about the hills,
and pulled the daisies fine;
But we've wandered many a weary foot,
since auld lang syne.

Chorus

We two have paddled in the stream,
from morning sun till dine;
But seas between us broad have roared
since auld lang syne.

Chorus

And there's a hand my trusty friend!
And give me a hand o' thine!
And we'll take a right good-will draught,
for auld lang syne.

Chorus

== History ==
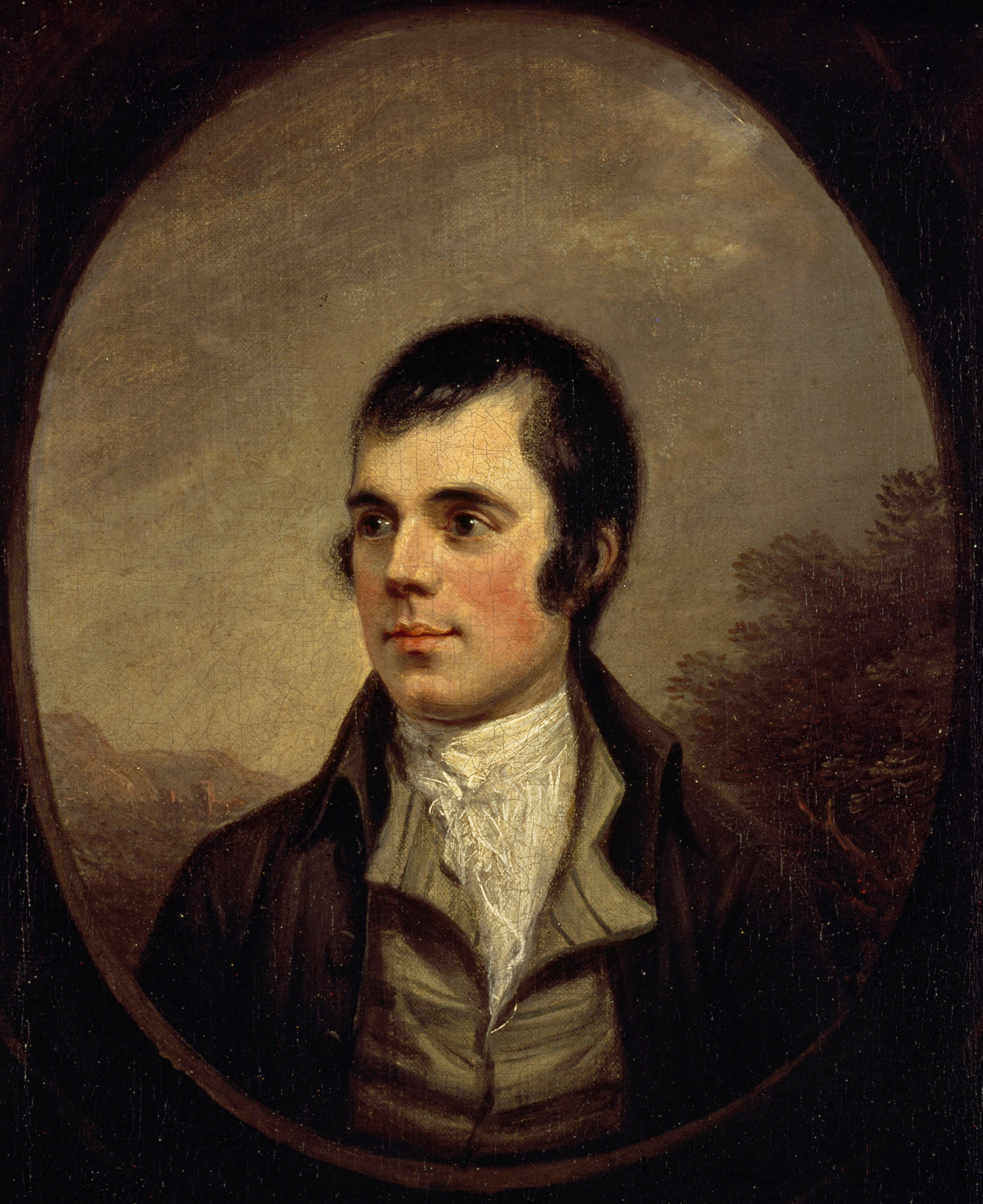
Robert Burns

Burns sent a copy of the original song to the Scots Musical Museum in 1788 with the remark, "The following song, an old song, of the olden times, and which has never been in print, nor even in manuscript until I took it down from an old man."

Some of the lyrics were indeed "collected" rather than composed by the poet; the ballad "Old Long Syne" printed in 1711 by James Watson shows considerable similarity in the first verse and the chorus to Burns's later poem, and is almost certainly derived from the same "old song". To quote from the first stanza of the James Watson ballad:

Should Old Acquaintance be forgot,
and never thought upon;
The flames of Love extinguished,
and fully past and gone:
Is thy sweet Heart now grown so cold,
that loving Breast of thine;
That thou canst never once reflect
On old long syne.

Chorus:
On old long syne my Jo,
On old long syne,
That thou canst never once reflect,
On old long syne.

It is a fair supposition to attribute the rest of the poem to Burns himself.

The song originally had another melody, which can be traced to around 1700 and was deemed "mediocre" by Robert Burns. The first documented use of the melody commonly used today was in 1799, in the second volume of George Thomson's Select Songs of Scotland. The tune is a pentatonic Scots folk melody, which was probably originally a sprightly dance with a much quicker tempo. There is some doubt as to whether this melody is the one Burns originally intended his version of the song to be sung to.

"Auld Lang Syne"
1910 performance; first and last verse
Frank C. Stanley

Instrumental performance
United States Navy Band

Classic New Year's Eve arrangement
Les Deux Love Orchestra

Voice with piano

Singing the song on Hogmanay or New Year's Eve very quickly became a Scots custom that soon spread to other parts of the British Isles. As Scots (as well as English, Welsh and Irish people) emigrated around the world, they took the song with them.

Versions of "Auld Lang Syne" which use other lyrics and melodies have survived as folk songs in isolated Scottish communities. The American folk song collector James Madison Carpenter collected a version of the song from a man named William Still of Cuminestown, Aberdeenshire in the early 1930s, who can be heard singing the song on the Vaughan Williams Memorial Library website.

== Settings and quotations of the melody ==
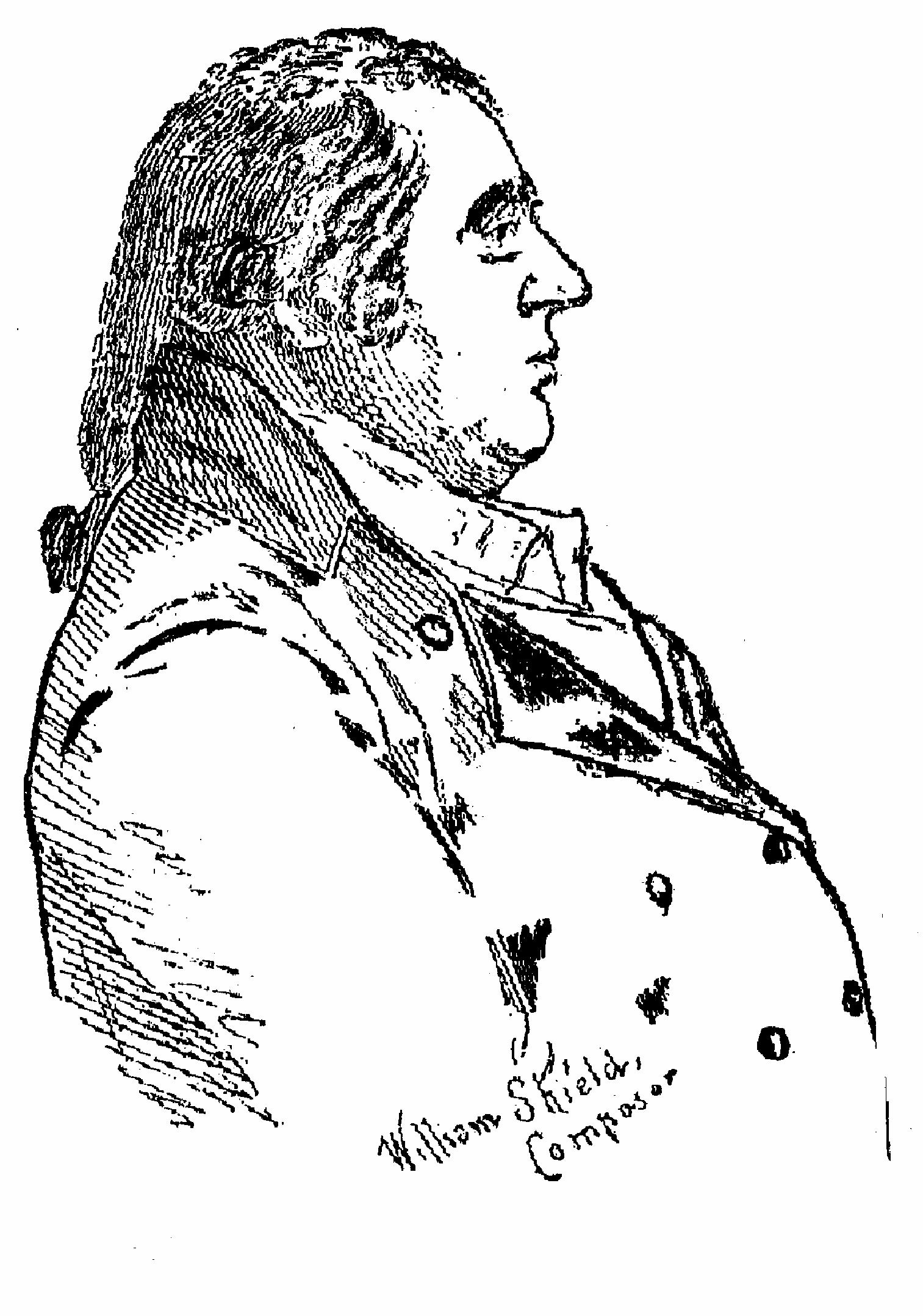
William Shield (1748–1829)

The English composer William Shield seems to quote the "Auld Lang Syne" melody briefly at the end of the overture to his opera Rosina (1782), which may be its first recorded use. The contention that Burns borrowed the melody from Shield is for various reasons highly unlikely, although they may very well both have taken it from a common source, possibly a strathspey called "The Miller's Wedding" or "The Miller's Daughter".

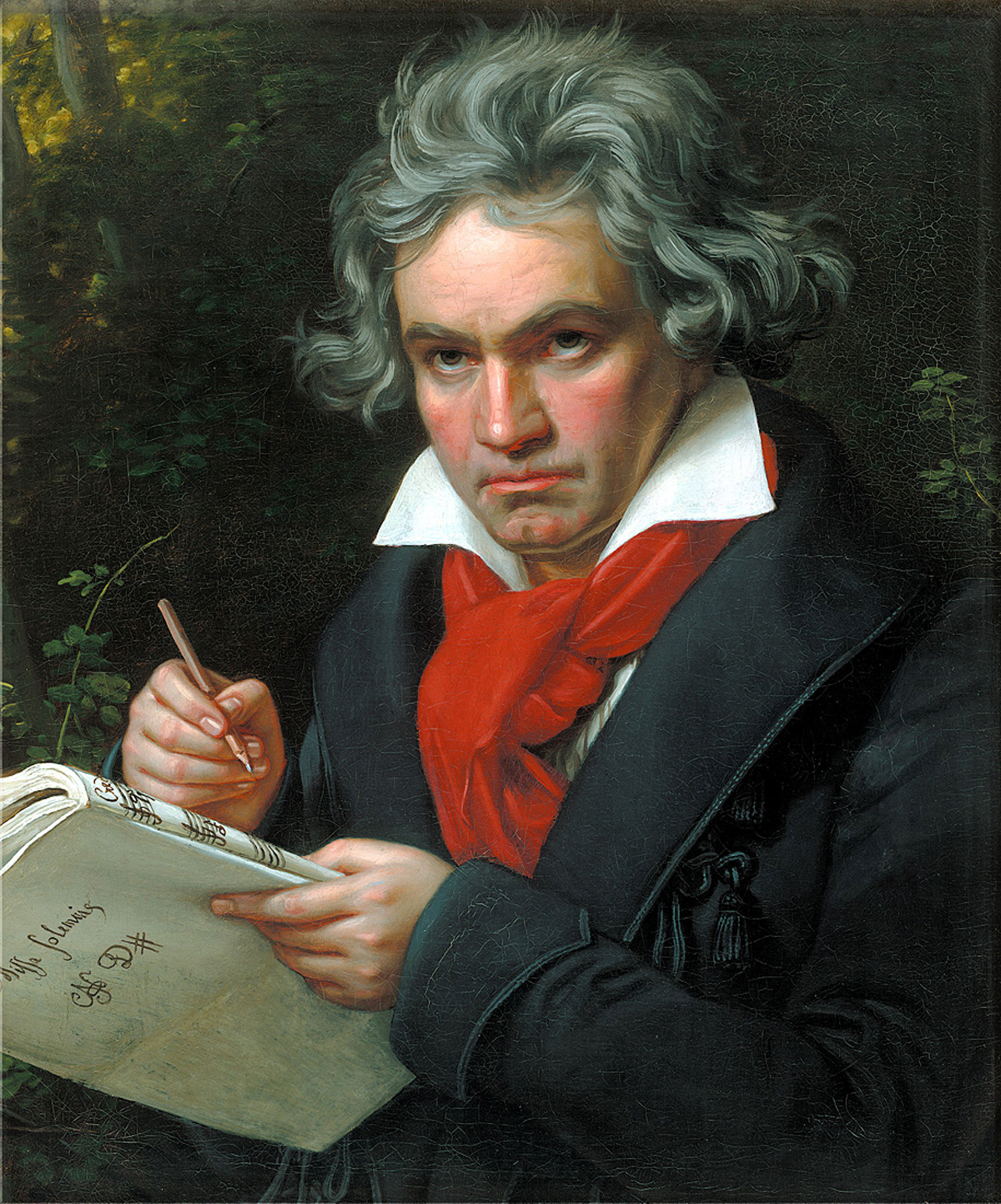
Ludwig van Beethoven (1770–1827)

In 1792 the Austrian composer Joseph Haydn arranged Auld Lang Syne as one of over 400 Scottish folk song arrangements commissioned by George Thomson and the publishers William Napier and William Whyte; his arrangement may have helped popularise the song. Ludwig van Beethoven also wrote an arrangement of Auld Lang Syne (WoO 156/11) published as part of his 12 Scottish Folksongs (1814). Both of these classical versions use the original brisk strathspey rhythm.

In 1855 different words were written for the Auld Lang Syne tune by Albert Laighton and titled, "Song of the Old Folks". This song was included in the tunebook, Father Kemp's Old Folks Concert Tunes published in Boston, United States, in 1860. For many years it was the tradition of the Stoughton Musical Society to sing this version in memory of those who had died that year.

The composer and singer George M. Cohan quotes the first line of the "Auld Lang Syne" melody in the second to last line of the chorus of "You're a Grand Old Flag". It is plain from the lyrics that this is deliberate; the melody is identical except the first syllable of the word "forgot".

John Philip Sousa quotes the melody in the Trio section of his 1924 march "Ancient and Honorable Artillery Company".

English composer of light music Ernest Tomlinson wrote a Fantasia on Auld Lang Syne (1976), which in its 20 minutes weaves in 152 quotations from pieces by other popular and classical composers.

In the Sacred Harp choral tradition, an arrangement of it exists under the name "Plenary". The lyrics are a memento mori and begin with the words "Hark! from the tomb a doleful sound". Another Christian setting, using the name "Fair Haven" for the same tune, uses the text "Hail! Sweetest, Dearest Tie That Binds" by Amos Sutton. In a similar vein, in 1999 Cliff Richard released a setting of the Lord's Prayer (as "The Millennium Prayer") to the melody.

British soldiers in the trenches of the First World War sang "We're Here Because We're Here" to the tune of "Auld Lang Syne".

== When sung ==
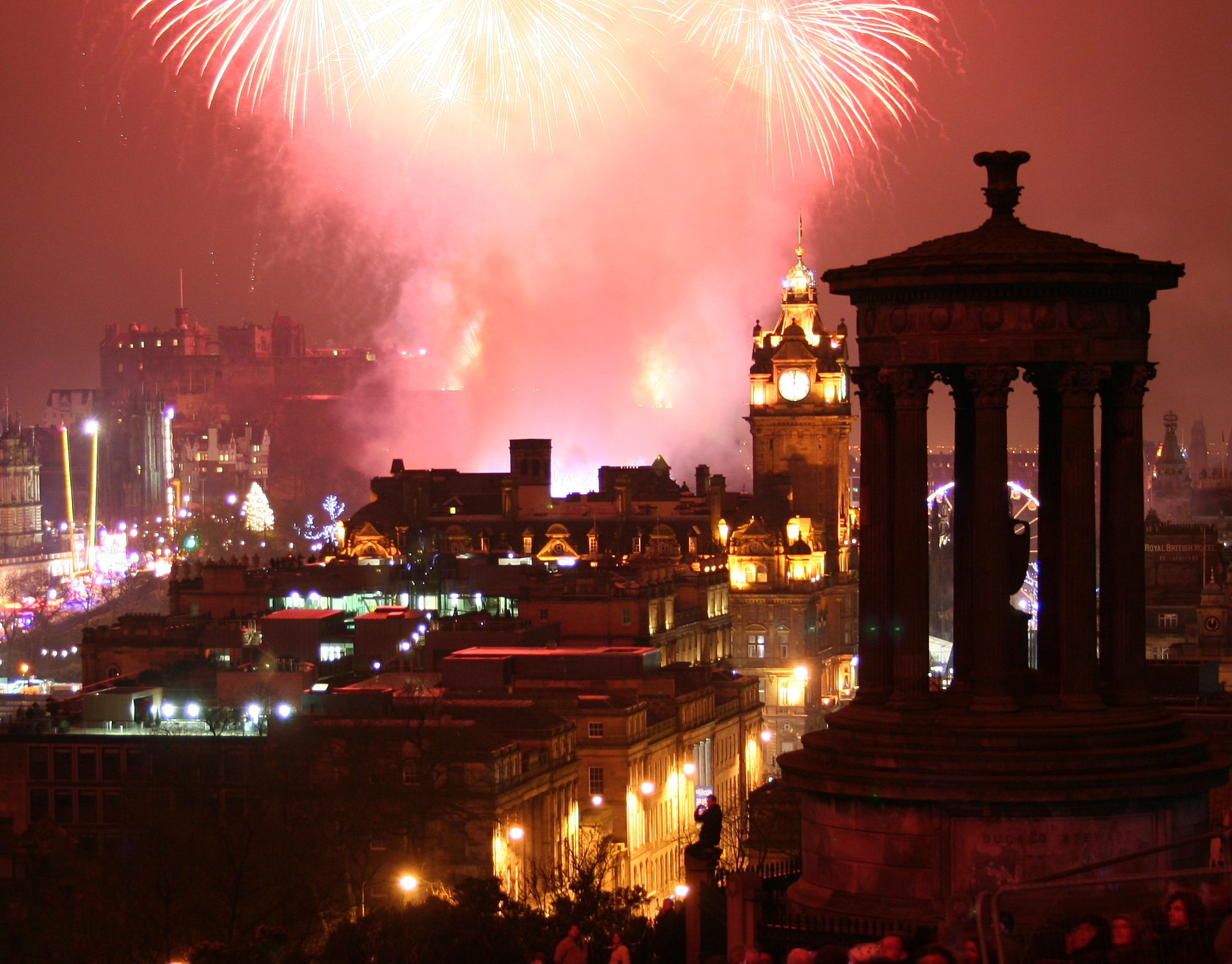
Fireworks at Edinburgh's Hogmanay

=== At New Year ===
New Year's festivities in New York City on January 1, 1958
"Auld Lang Syne" performed by Guy Lombardo and His Royal Canadians during New Year's festivities in Times Square on 1 January 1958.

"Auld Lang Syne" is traditionally sung at the conclusion of New Year gatherings in Scotland and around the world, especially in English-speaking countries.

At Hogmanay in Scotland, it is common practice that everyone joins hands with the person next to them to form a great circle around the dance floor. At the beginning of the last verse (And there's a hand, my trusty fiere!/and gie's a hand o' thine!), everyone crosses their arms across their breast, so that the right hand reaches out to the neighbour on the left and vice versa.

When the tune ends, everyone rushes to the middle, while still holding hands. When the circle is re-established, everyone turns under the arms to end up facing outwards with hands still joined. The tradition of singing the song when parting, with crossed hands linked, arose in the mid-19th century among Freemasons and other fraternal organisations.

Outside Scotland the hands are often crossed from the beginning of the song, at variance with Scottish custom. The Scottish practice was demonstrated by Queen Elizabeth II at the Millennium Dome celebrations for the year 2000. Some press outlets berated her for not "properly" crossing her arms, unaware that she was correctly following the Scottish tradition.

=== At other times ===
As well as celebrating the New Year, "Auld Lang Syne" is very widely used to symbolise other "old endings/new beginnings" – including farewells, funerals (and other memorials of the dead), graduations, the end of a (non-New Year) party or a Scout gathering, the election of a new government, the last lowering of the Union Jack as a British colony achieves independence and as a signal that a retail store is about to close for the day. The melody is also widely used for other words, especially hymns, the songs of sporting and other clubs, and national anthems (South Korea in the 1940s, and the Maldives until 1972). In Scotland and other parts of Britain, in particular, it is associated with celebrations and memorials of Robert Burns. The following list of specific uses is far from comprehensive.

==== In the English-speaking world ====
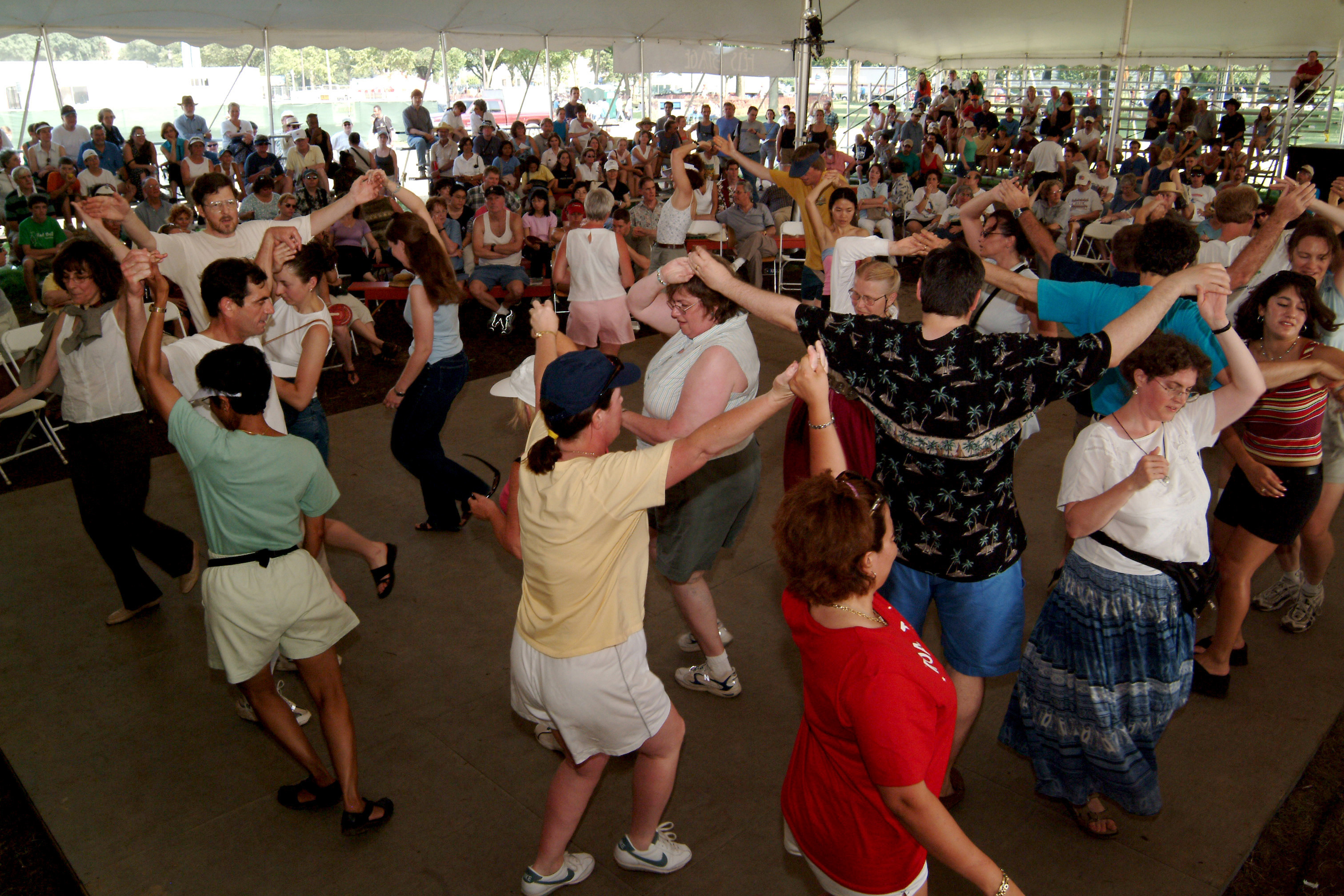
Scottish cèilidh

- In Scotland it is often sung at the end of a cèilidh, a dance, and at weddings. At weddings, it is performed in the same way as at New Year, but the bride and groom are often lifted up in the centre of the circle.
- The tune is played, and sung by the crowd, in the final stages of the annual Edinburgh Military Tattoo.
- In many Burns Clubs it is sung at the end of the Burns supper.
- In Great Britain it is played at the close of the annual Congress (conference) of the Trades Union Congress. It is also usually the final song of the Liberal Democrat Glee Club.
- The song is sung at the end of the Last Night of the Proms. Depending on whether an "official" performance is planned it may not be listed on the programme but in this case the audience will maintain the tradition and sing it themselves, with or without backup from the performers.
- The song is played at the Passing Out Parade of Young Officers in the Royal Navy as they march up the steps of the Britannia Royal Naval College; for Royal Air Force officers at Royal Air Force College Cranwell, and at the Sovereign's Parade at the Royal Military Academy Sandhurst for young officers joining the British Army, as the cadets march up the steps of their famous Old College building – to the beat of the slow march, after the tune "Will ye no come back?". This custom (or something very like it) is also followed in Naval and Military colleges in many other countries, especially members and former members of the Commonwealth of Nations. Examples include the Royal Military College of Canada, the Royal Military College (Malaysia), the National Defence Academy (India), the Pakistan Military Academy, Bangladesh Military Academy, Sri Lanka Military Academy, Sardar Vallabhbhai Patel National Police Academy (SVPNPA-India) and at the equivalent colleges in Singapore, Burma and Nigeria.
- The song is very widely used by the international Scout Movement, where it is a popular closing song for jamborees and other occasions.

==== In non-English-speaking countries ====
"Auld Lang Syne" has been translated into many languages, and the song is widely sung all over the world. The song's pentatonic scale matches scales used in South Korea, Japan, India, China and other Asian countries, which has facilitated the popularity of the melody in the East. The following list of particular examples details things that are special or unusual about the use of the song in a particular country, and is (necessarily) not comprehensive.

- In France the Jesuit priest and scouting pioneer Jacques Sevin translated the song in 1920. It has become a standard farewell song under the title "Ce n'est qu'un au revoir" (just saying goodbye). A Catholic hymn entitled "Restons toujours unis" was also written on the same tune. Masonic lodges use it widely too, remembering the fact that Burns was a mason.
- In Denmark the song was translated in 1927 by the Danish poet Jeppe Aakjær. Much like Robert Burns' use of dialect, Aakjær translated the song into Sallingbomål, a form of the Jutlandic dialect. The song "Skuld gammel venskab rejn forgo" is an integral part of the Danish Højskole tradition, and often associated with more rural areas and old traditions.
- In the Netherlands the melody is used as the Dutch football song "Wij houden van Oranje" ("We Love Orange"), performed by André Hazes.
- In West Bengal and Bangladesh the melody was the direct inspiration for the Bengali folk song "Purano shei diner kotha" ("Memories of the Good Old Days"), composed by the Nobel laureate Rabindranath Tagore, and forms one of the more recognisable tunes in Rabindra Sangeet ("Rabindra's Songs"), a body of work of 2,230 songs and lyrical poems that form the backbone of Bengali music.
- In Thailand the song "Samakkhi Chumnum" (สามัคคีชุมนุม, 'together in unity') is set to the same melody. It is mainly sung after sporting fixtures and at the end of Boy Scout jamborees. The Thai lyrics are a patriotic song about the King and national unity, and many Thais are not aware of the song's Western origin.
- In Japan, the melody is used for the song "Hotaru no Hikari" (The Light of the Fireflies), which has different lyrics. "Hotaru no Hikari" is played at many school graduation ceremonies, and at the end of the New Year's Eve show NHK Kōhaku Uta Gassen. A waltz arrangement of the original (based on the version featured in the 1940 film Waterloo Bridge) is played in various establishments such as bars, restaurants, or department stores in Japan to let the customers know that the establishment is closing soon.

National anthem of South Korea from 1945 to 1948

- In South Korea the song is known as "Jakbyeol" (작별, Farewell) or (less commonly) as "Seokbyeol-ui Jeong" (석별의 정, The Feeling of Farewell). From 1919 to 1945 it served as the national anthem of the Korean exile government and from 1945 to 1948, it was the melody of South Korea's national anthem. The lyrics used then were the same as the current South Korean national anthem, with some slight differences.
- Before 1972 it was the tune for the anthem of the Maldives (with the current words).
- In Sweden the artist Thomas Stenström made an interpretation of the song for the Swedish cancer association. The Swedish name of the song is "Ser du månen där du är ikväll? (Tillsammans igen)" (Do you see the moon where you are this evening? (Together again).
- In Poland a loose translation is sung as a conclusion of scouts meetings, sometimes reserved only for more significant occasions. Often performed in a circle, with arms crossed across the chest and holding hands with both neighbors, similar to the Scottish custom (hands holding from the beginning of the song with unraveling the circle at the end).
- In Indonesia the song is known as "Kini Saat Tibanya".
- In Germany there is a translated version named "Nehmt Abschied Brüder ungewiss ist alle Wiederkehr" to be found. It is cited in a famous Song Book, widely used bei the Scouts named "Die Mundorgel".

=== Use in films ===
The strong and obvious associations of the song and its melody have made it a common staple for film soundtracks from the very early days of "talking" pictures to the present—a large number of films and television series' episodes having used it for background, generally but by no means exclusively to evoke the New Year. One such example of this is the 1946 film It's a Wonderful Life.

=== Use in literature ===
The song and its lyrics have featured in novels and stories many times.

- Charles Dickens referenced it in both David Copperfield and Our Mutual Friend.
- The short ghost story "Old Acquaintance" by Peter Wise is constructed around the full lyrics of Auld Lang Syne. It appears in "Chilling the Water", his second collection of original ghost stories set around rivers and lakes .
- Originally published in 1895, The Days of Auld Lang Syne by Ian MacLaren is a collection of short stories exploring the lives of a rural farming community in Drumtochty.

== Notable performances ==
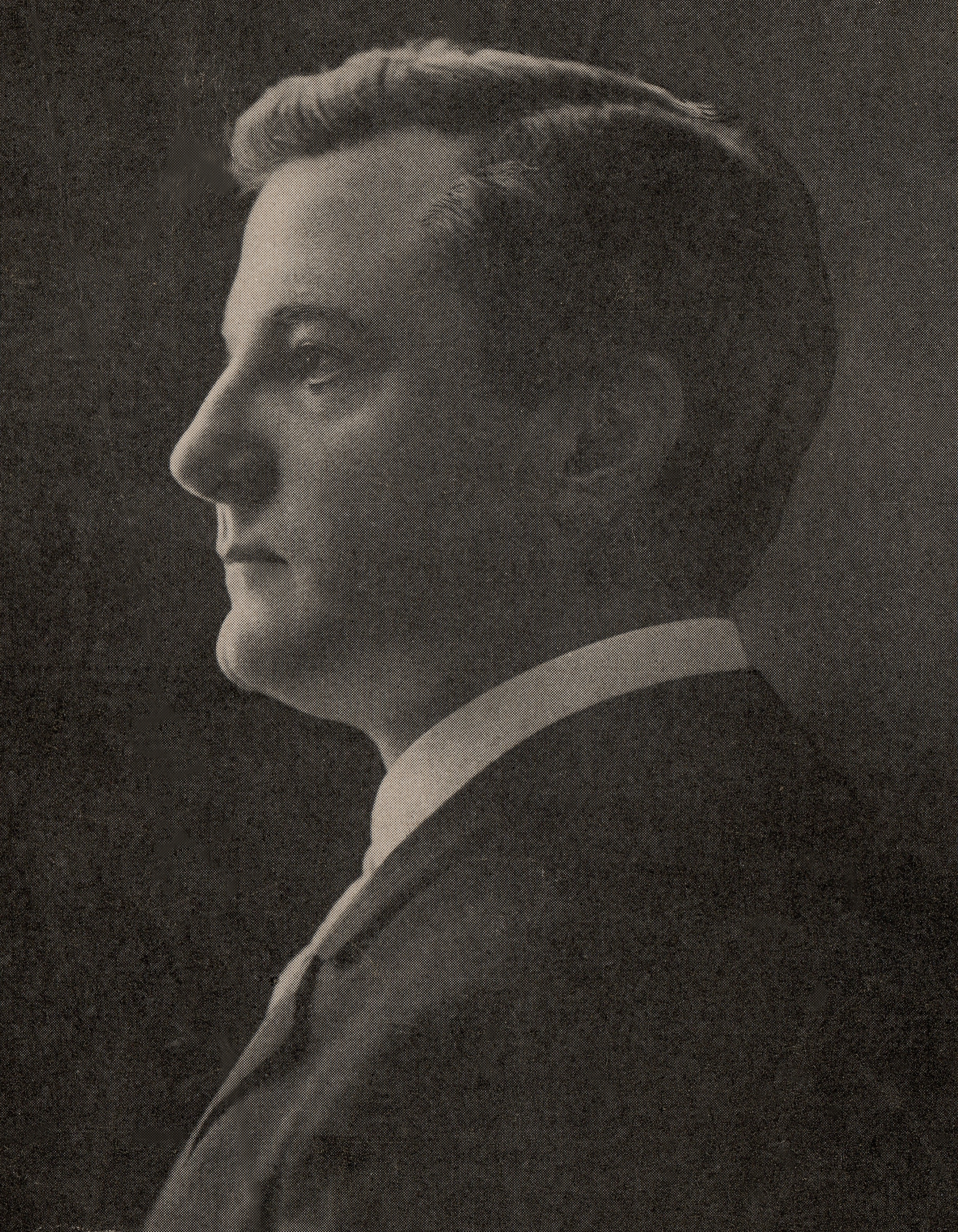
Frank C. Stanley (1868–1910)

=== Recordings ===
The first recording of the song was made on wax cylinder in 1898 by the Englishmen Charles Samuel Myers and Alfred Cort Hadden, who sang it in a demonstration of the new technology whilst on an expedition to record Torres Strait Islander music with figures including Charles Gabriel Seligman, W.H.R. Rivers and Sidney Herbert Ray. The original 1898 recording can be heard online via the British Library Sound Archive website.

As a standard in music, "Auld Lang Syne" has since been recorded many times, in every conceivable style, by many artists, both well-known and obscure. The first commercial recording was probably that of Frank C. Stanley, who recorded the song in 1910 (which can be heard above). In late 1999 an instrumental rendition by the American saxophonist Kenny G reached No. 7 on the Billboard Hot 100 upon release as a single. At the time of charting it was the oldest-written song to make the Hot 100 charts. Kenny G's recording incorporates an audio collage of sound bites taken from throughout 20th century history.

=== Live and broadcast ===
- 1929: Guy Lombardo and His Royal Canadians performed it on New Year's Eve for decades until at least 1977: The introduction to Lombardo's 1947 Decca Records version is played in Times Square every New Year's immediately following the dropping of the ball.
- 1980: Auld Lang Syne was the last song to be marched to by the Rhodesian Light Infantry in its final military parade before the regiment was disbanded.
- 1997: On 30 June, the day before Hong Kong was handed over from the United Kingdom to the People's Republic of China, the tune was played by the silver and pipe bands from the Royal Hong Kong Police Force, at the departure of Hong Kong's 28th and last British Governor, Chris Patten, from his official residence, Government House, Hong Kong. It was also later played in the British Farewell Ceremony later that night when the last British troops of the Black Watch marched away from the Tamar, Hong Kong site.
- 2004: On 31 March, the tune was sung by the attendees after the unfurling of a banner to mark the closure of the old Singapore National Library at Stamford Road.
- 2009: On 30 November (Saint Andrew's Day) students and staff at the University of Glasgow sang it in 41 languages simultaneously.
- 2015: On 25 March it was performed by a bagpiper from the Singapore Police Force's Gurkha Contingent Pipes and Drums Platoon at The Istana as a form of respect to former prime minister of Singapore Lee Kuan Yew during his state funeral.
- 2020: On 29 January it was sung by some members of the European Parliament when the Brexit withdrawal agreement was passed, ending the UK's membership in the European Union, finalised two days later on 31 January.
- 2022: On 20 February, at 21:40 CST, it was sung in Mandarin Chinese to mark the end of the 2022 Winter Olympics closing ceremony.
