= Joseph Chanel =

Singaporean educator (1918–1989)

Brother Joseph Chanel as the principal of Maris Stella High School in 1962.

Soon Guan Han (Chinese: 孙光汉; 14 December 1918 – 17 August 1989), better known under the religious name Brother Joseph Chanel Soon or Joche Chanel, was a prominent educator in Singapore who founded the Maris Stella High School in 1958 and served as its headmaster until 1982.

== Early life and education ==
Soon was born in Beijing, China, on 14 December 1918 to a family who were initially Buddhist. His father, a railway worker who died when he was five, was converted to Roman Catholicism by his friends of the faith while on his deathbed. Following his father's death, Soon was raised primarily by his mother. He claimed to have first "felt his 'call' to Gods' service" when he was eight. At the age of 11, he joined the Marist Brothers. He studied at the Chinese Department of the Fu Jen Catholic University in Beijing.

== Career ==
After graduating from university in 1938, Soon began teaching in Beijing and Shandong. He was first posted to the Maris Stella School there. He moved to Tianjin in 1947 and also taught in the provinces of Hubei and Sichuan in this period. Brother Chanel came to Southeast Asia in 1950. He served as the headmaster of the Kim Sen School in Bukit Mertajam in Penang and of the Sam Tet School in Ipoh, Perak. In 1952, he was posted to Singapore and began teaching at the Catholic High School (CHS), a boys' school which taught in both English and Chinese and had come under Marist management about two years prior, serving as the Director of Academic Affairs.

In 1957, it was announced that Soon would be setting up another Marist school to address the demand for a school to supplement CHS, which was then performing well. It was decided that the Chinese-medium boys' school, to be named the Maris Stella High School (MSHS) after the first institution he had taught at, would initially operate out of the premises of the St Stephen's Primary School in the afternoon, and that Soon was to be its founding headmaster. After receiving the approval of the local Ministry of Education, enrollment began in November. The school eventually expanded over the years by occupying the classrooms and facilities of primary schools that were willing to lend them to MSHS; these premises were often located at a distance from one another, and Soon would often travel between them. In this period, he had to work with limited resources and the school frequently suffered from a shortage of teachers.

The year after the founding of MSHS, Soon secured a site for the school at the junction of Fort Road and Mountbatten Road, though the contract stipulated that the school was to be built within two years. Despite being a "tireless canvasser for funds", He was unable to raise enough to erect the premises, and the land was returned in 1961. Eventually, Soon was successful in securing a site for MSHS on Mount Vernon, and its premises were erected from 1967 to 1968. As headmaster, he sat on the Chinese Secondary School Principals' Association and was elected the chair in March 1972. He oversaw the school's transition from being Chinese-medium to teaching in both English and Chinese to be "in line with the government's bilingual policy" in 1978.

As principal, Soon sought to prioritise "effective biculturalism, co-curricular activities, religious instruction for Catholic students". Under his tenure, MSHS performed well academically, achieving a 100% pass rate at its first Secondary Four examinations in 1961 and its first Primary School Leaving Examination in 1963. The examinations in 1961 coincided with the Chinese School Students' Examination Boycott; Soon accompanied the graduating class to the venue and guided them over a fence and a wall to reach the examination hall. Lecturer and stockbroker Wang Ting-min named Soon as "the person [he respected] the most in [his] life" in 1978, recalling that the latter "always taught [them] to bear hardship without complaint". He was known to regularly issue corporal punishment. He also "paid special attention" to weaker students and those who were of less fortunate backgrounds, providing the latter with free food and stationery through the church's local welfare organisations. For his contributions to education in the country, Soon was conferred the Public Administration Medal (Bronze) at the 1971 National Day Awards.

Soon retired as headmaster at the start of 1982, being succeeded by Brother John Lek, though he was to continue with the school as a religious teacher and organiser for fundraisers and planned on writing a book chronicling the history of MSHS. On 12 February, the school held a farewell for him, at which politician Ho Kah Leong spoke and commended Soon's dedication to education. He was then conferred the Long Service Medal at the National Day Awards later that year. A monument with includes a bust of Soon was installed in the school's courtyard in 1985. In 1994, MSHS celebrated Founders' Day on 17 August, the anniversary of Soon's death. The schools' alumni association also launched a scholarship named for Soon on that day, to be awarded to the top performing students of MSHS academically. According to researcher Chee Meng Wong, Soon remains the "most revered figure towering over the history of Maris Stella." He was "fondly remembered for his kind and gentle character."

== Personal life and death ==
By 1979, Soon reportedly spoke English "with a bit of Peking burr" which "still [marked] him out as a native of China." He was then still in possession of a "boyish exuberance" and "good health", which he attributed to "praying and maybe a little exercise too."

Soon spent his final years at the Marist convent at 15 Flower Road. He died of liver disease an hour past midnight on 17 August 1989. The funeral Mass was held on 20 August at the Church of the Immaculate Heart of Mary on Highland Road, and after this he was cremated at Mount Vernon.
