= Maris Stella High School =

Autonomous Catholic boys school in Singapore

- 海星中学; Sekolah Tinggi Maris Stella

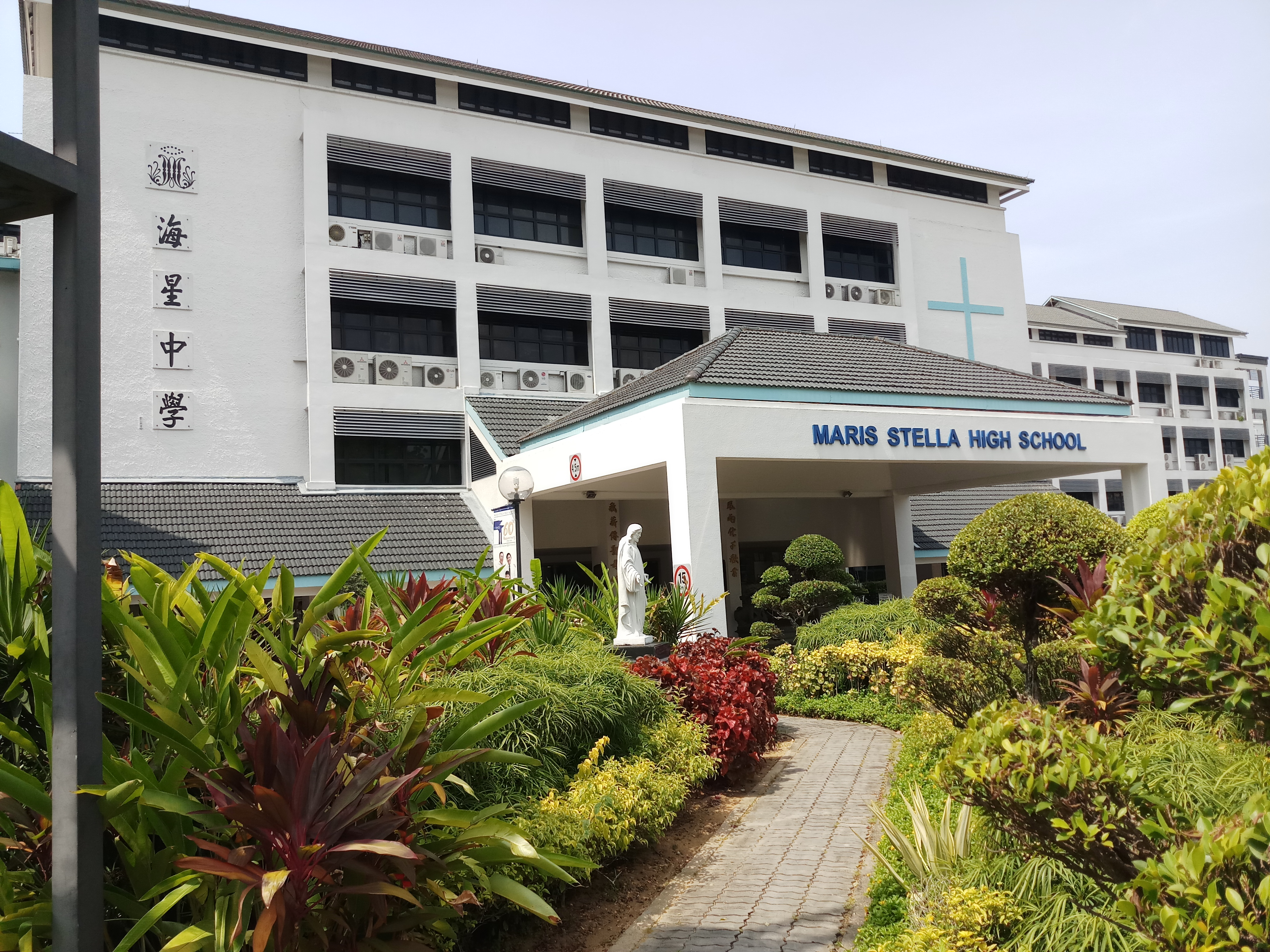

Location
- Main Campus: 25 Mount Vernon Road, Singapore 368051; Secondary Holding Site: 20 Jalan Damai, Singapore 4196122; Primary Holding Site: Mattar Road, Singapore; 387724; Bartley (Main campus); Mattar (Primary holding site); Kaki Bukit / Jalan Damai (Secondary holding site); Singapore

Information
- Type: Boys; Autonomous; Government-aided; Special Assistance Plan (SAP)
- Motto: 勤·勉·忠·勇 (Diligence, Determination, Loyalty and Courage)
- Established: 1958; 68 years ago
- Founder: Brother Joche Chanel Soon
- Status: Main Campus to close for redevelopment w.e.f November 11, 2026.
- Session: Single session
- School code: 7111
- Principal: Mr Boy Eng Seng
- Vice-Principal (Secondary): Mr Harold Goh Chi-Yuan
- Vice-Principal (Secondary): Mr Tan Kok Heng Daniel
- Vice-Principal (Primary): Mr Choo Qing Yi
- Vice-Principal (Primary): Mr Benedict Lim
- Primary years taught: Primary 1 through 6
- Secondary years taught: Secondary 1 through 4
- Gender: Male
- Enrolment: approx. 3000
- Language: English
- Colour: Blue white
- Fight song: 海星 Hey! 海星 Pride! 海星 Best!
- Affiliation: Catholic Junior College; Marist Brothers
- Alumni: Maris Stella High School Alumni Maris Stella High School Alumni (Youth Wing)
- Website: marisstellahigh.moe.edu.sg

Maris Stella High School (MSHS) (Chinese: 海星中学; pinyin: Hǎixīng Zhōngxué) is a government-aided, all-boys Catholic secondary school with autonomous status. As a full school, it comprises a primary section offering a six-year programme leading up to the Primary School Leaving Examination and a secondary section offering a four-year programme leading up to the Singapore-Cambridge GCE Ordinary Level examinations. Run by the international Marist Brothers at Mount Vernon Road, Singapore near Bartley MRT station, Maris Stella High School is one of the eleven Special Assistance Plan (SAP) high schools in Singapore.

== History ==
=== Founding ===
Maris Stella High School was founded in 1958 by the international Marist Brothers to ease overwhelming applications for admission to Catholic High School. The school begun operations with eleven teachers, running a primary section of 163 students and a secondary section of 124 students. Academic lessons took place in the afternoon at St. Stephen's School in Siglap.

As enrolment rose, other schools were approached for assistance in lesson grounds. Between 1963 and 1966, Maris Stella High School functioned concurrently at different premises. Among them were Silat Road Government Integrated Primary School, St. Patrick's School, Opera Estate Convent, Tung Ling English School, and Jalan Kembangan Integrated Primary School. Numerous issues plagued the institution, both in administration as well as in conducting lessons, as the premises used were miles apart. The school also ran pre-university classes between 1964 and 1975.

=== Mount Vernon campus ===
On 22 October 1966, Maris Stella High School moved into a permanent campus at Mount Vernon Road. The campus was built with fifteen classrooms and a four-storey science block. A grand celebration was held to mark the official opening of the new school. In 1969, the second phrase of the campus development was completed, consisting of an administrative block and a 1600-seat auditorium. In total, these two phases of development cost over S$1.3 million.

In 1974, the development project for the expansion of the campus was launched. The new five-storey building for the primary section was completed by the end of October 1975, at a cost of about $1.1 million. The new building was officially declared open on 11 September 1976.

A separate 3.11 hectares site for the primary section was acquired in 1982, which was adjacent to the present school building. A designated three-storey school building was built and opened in 1987, and that year, in order to cope with its large student population, the primary and secondary sections were split into independently functioning entities.

=== Attainment of SAP status ===
By the late 1970s, The Straits Times reported that the school's academic performance was good, having a pass rate of at least 97% in the Primary School Leaving Examination, and a mean pass rate of 90% in the GCE Ordinary Levels. The school was also one of the few Chinese-medium schools in Singapore at that time not facing falling primary enrolment.

In 1978, the school was selected as one of the initial list of Special Assistance Plan schools. The first batch of nine schools, including Maris Stella High, welcomed its first full cohort of Special Stream students in 1979. That same year, the school introduced instruction in English for several subjects. In line with the Ministry of Education's bilingualism policy of the late 1970s, the school introduced English-speaking days and requested students to speak English during assemblies.

=== Autonomous status ===
In 1996, Maris Stella High School became an autonomous school, the additional funds providing extra programmes and facilities. From 1995 to 1997, the school moved to a temporary site at Mount Vernon Secondary School while the school was rebuilt.

=== New millennia ===
In 2001, Maris Stella High School was designated the N4 Cluster Life Sciences Hub. In 2002, they were further designated as a Cluster Centre of Excellence for Information and Communication Technology (ICT). With this certification, Maris Stella High School obtained the prestigious Apple Learning Interchange (ACI) status through Apple's pilot of selected elite institutions worldwide - sending a curated number of staff to the Apple Campus in Cupertino in order to establish collaborative teaching networks and build early open educational modules. Maris Stella High School shortly became one of the first schools to establish the Singapore Learning Interchange (SGLI), serving as Apple's regional network for curriculum sharing. With the eventual phasing out of the Apple Learning Interchange (ALI) on September 3, 2010, Maris Stella High School transitioned to a 1-1 MacBook programme with the help of existing on-campus infrastructure, including their specialized Apple Service Centre.

=== Campus & identity redevelopment (2024-) ===
On 6 May 2024, it was announced that Maris Stella High School will be rebuilt between 2027 and 2029 with the secondary and primary sections moved into different holding campuses, former Bedok North Secondary School site in Jalan Damai and former MacPherson Primary School site in Mattar Road respectively, in 2027. It was also announced the all boys primary section will be converted into co-educational with female students intake from 2027 while the secondary section remains as an all boys school. To manage the holding site campus capacity (namely its primary school arm at Mattar), the school announced both morning and afternoon sessions, with morning sessions reserved for upper primary levels, and afternoon sessions reserved for lower primary levels.

Maris Stella High School's secondary school campus in Jalan Damai will feature 3-4 storey buildings instead of the 7 storeys previously in the old campus, and will feature a school field, an indoor sports hall, and sheltered courts, some of which were not present at the heritage campus. Classrooms at the holding site are also 30% bigger in size.

With the introduction of a co-educational system in Maris Stella High School's primary section, the casual uniforms for both genders were changed, alongside changes of class names to offer a mix of both female and male saints (as compared to the previous versions, which contained names of male saints only). Maris Stella High School's ethos were also altered to be more gender neutral, with the iconic school vision, "Every Marist, a Gentleman of Faith, Vision and Service" being changed to "Honourable Marists of Faith, Vision and Service". Minimal edits were also made to the school's pledge, known as the Marist Creed, to include respect for "neighbours" and "schoolmates".

=== Future Campus redevelopment (2030s-) ===
With the redevelopment of the heritage campus at Bartley, the Ministry of Education allocated S$204,580,000 for the entire project of both the primary and secondary school campuses. This allocation does not include donations and funding from the Maris Stella High School's alumni association, which are expected to fund extra facilities which the Ministry of Education does not fund. In the new campus, plans have been revealed to incorporate two school fields (previously unavailable due to uneven land on Mount Vernon), a new chapel, multiple heritage trails, an indoor sports hall, and a "state-of-the-art performance theatre". A centralized multi-purpose hall which can be used to host events with the entire primary and secondary school section simultaneously was also announced, as well as a centralized library, with these shared facilities being situated at the centre of the campus to allow for convenient access for both sections. Plans for a swimming pool which have been discussed by generations of Marists (due to their aggressive funding for such a pool decades ago) was also confirmed to have fallen through, with the school board citing high maintenance costs and space constraints.

== School Culture & Spirit ==
Maris Stella High School is said to possess a diverse culture through inter-school events and competitions, and is strongly tied to the Marist Brothers, a global religious institute and global entity overseeing 600 schools across 80 countries,educating over 750,000 students with the support of thousands of Marist Brothers.

=== School Houses ===
Maris Stella High School features 4 houses (teams) named after pivotal figures who shaped the Marist brotherhood and mission, namely, Champagnat (red, donning the motto: 勤), Chanel (blue, donning the motto: 勉), Francois (yellow, donning the motto: 忠), and Alfano (green, donning the motto: 勇). Students of their respective houses compete in school programmes organized by the schools Student Council, earning points throughout the year to lift the "House Shield". Each house also features their own unique house cheer.

=== School Cheer ===
On a larger scale, Maris Stella High School features 3 school cheers typically used during sporting events or as a closer for notable school events. (e.g Founder's Day)

Maris Stella High School Cheers (lyrics and sequences)
海星 Hey! (Main Cheer)	海星 Pride!	海星 Best!
勤！(4x claps) 勉！(4x claps) 忠！(4x claps) 勇！(4x claps) 勤勉忠勇～海星 Hey! (2x) Tell me, ask me, who’s the best? Marist, Marist, we’re the best! Tell me, ask me, who’s the best? 海星，海星, we’re the best! Wooooaahh (Leader) 同学们，加油！ (All) 海星，加油！	海星 we fight! (1x claps) 海星 we smite！(1x claps) 海星 we win this all with pride！(1x claps) Marist wipeout！(1x claps) Marist full out! (1x claps) Marist we fear no obstacle! (1x claps) 勤！(1x claps) 勉！(1x claps) 忠！(1x claps) 勇！(1x claps) Marist!	M! (2x claps) S！(2x claps) H！(2x claps) S！(1x claps) Maris Stella we’re the best we will always win the rest! 海星 海星 海星 ~~ Hey! 勤勉忠勇 all the way!

These school cheers function as a fundamental identity and pride of Marists, where every Marist is taught during their orientations in Maris Stella.

=== Competition Rivals ===
Maris Stella High School has most of its co-curriculars positioned in League 1, the highest league, in the National School Games hosted nationwide, where they often compete against elite schools in various sports and aesthetics (e.g Basketball, Badminton, Debate). Maris Stella High School's most notable long-standing friendly rivalry is with Catholic High School, with both schools coming from similar backgrounds and adapting similar cultures.

=== Notable records broken ===
On June 30, 2007, as part of the school's Youth Day celebrations, the school organised a Hiphopthon in an attempt to set a new Singapore Record for the most number of people dancing hiphop at the same time. The Hiphopthon was held at Serangoon Junior College Sports Field and the event was adjudicated by the Singapore Book of Records. 1,435 Marists and staff members took part in the event, where the event was successful. Maris Stella High School now holds the record for the most number of people dancing hip-hop at the same time in Singapore.

On August 8, 2019, as part of the school's National Day celebrations and to commemorate the nation's Bicentennial, 2,580 Marists and staff members came together to form the largest human formation of a slogan, "SINGAPORE 200". This record attempt was successful, and certified by the Singapore Book of Records.

=== Notable events hosted ===
Maris Stella High School is also the annual host of the National Chinese Short Film Competition, inviting secondary schools and junior colleges to submit films and receive mentorship from industry experts through workshops hosted during the programme. Moreover, the school is a regular host of the Mid-Autumn Festival, oftentimes inviting other primary and secondary schools to their celebration.

=== Local and International Partnerships ===
Maris Stella High School was the first school to participate in SMRT's "Adopt-a-Station" program on September 18, 2014, kicking off the pilot program with adopting Bartley MRT Station, with wall murals and service ambassadorship training being integrated into the program. Maris Stella High School continues to work with the community in present-day, with artwork from the schools' primary school students being featured along the displays of Woodleigh Bus Interchange.

Through the Marist Brothers network of schools, Maris Stella High School hosts exchanges with the staff and students of other Marist Brothers schools worldwide, including Hong Kong, Philippines, and Japan. They also maintain a relationship with Xi'an Gaoxin No.1 High School, where both schools host students and staff from each institution on a yearly basis.

== Principals ==
Name of principal	Years served	Reference
J. Chanel Soon F.M.S.	1958 – 1981	
John Lek F.M.S.	1982 – 1984	
Anthony Tan Kim Hock F.M.S.	1984 – 2009	
Lim Choon Kiat Joseph	2009 – 2015	
Woo Soo Min	2016 – 2022	
Boy Eng Seng	2023 – Present	

== Notable Alumni ==
- Dato' Low Tuck Kwong: Billionaire, Director of PT Bayan Resources Tbk
- Kwek Leng Joo: Late Executive Director of City Developments Limited (CDL)
- Lee Yi Shyan: Politician
- Ong Ye Kung: Minister of Health; MP for Sembawang GRC
- Koh Poh Koon: MP for Tampines GRC
- Moses Lim: Late actor and comedian
- Cavin Soh: Actor and singer
- Rain Chua: Athlete, Guinness World Record holder for most rear pull-ups in a minute

The Maris Stella Alumni Network also comprises 1350 members, having hosted 115 events to date.
