= List of military operations involving Gurkhas =

This is a list of operations carried out by the Brigade of Gurkhas (United Kingdom), Gurkha Contingent (Singapore), Gorkha regiments (India), and other Gurkha armies but not by the Nepal Army.

== Asia ==
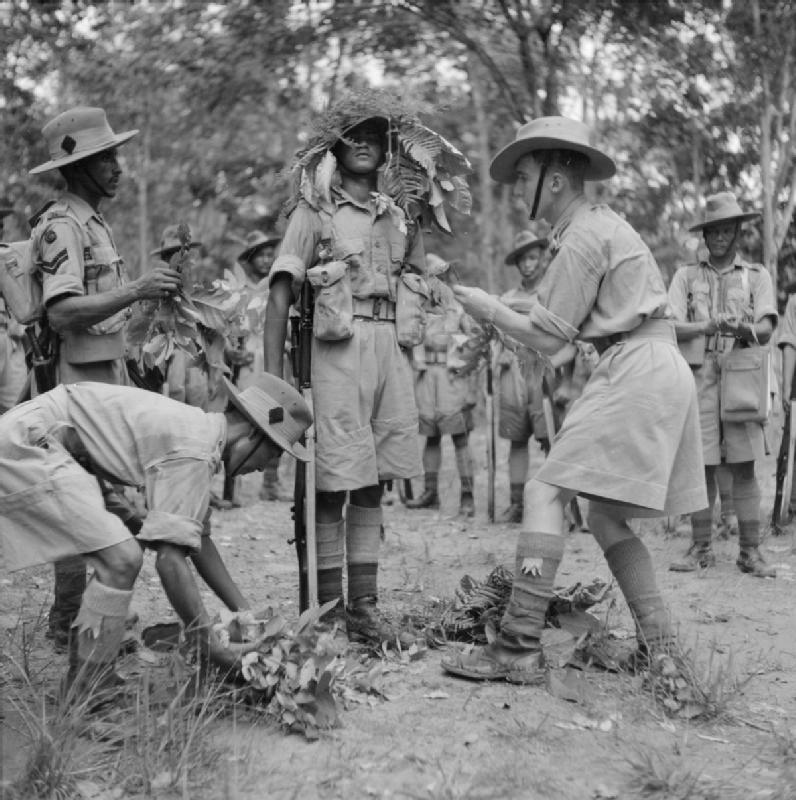
Men of the 2/9th Gurkha Rifles being instructed in the use of camouflage in the Malayan jungle, October 1941.

=== First Anglo-Sikh War (India, 1846) ===
After the Anglo-Gorkha war, a conflict arose between the British and Punjab. Both wanted to avoid conflict. However, after the death of Ranjit Singh, the ruler of Punjab, the Sikh army fought wars against the British. In 1845 the Sikhs invaded British territory at Satluj.

In December 1846, an inconclusive battle was fought at Ferozeshah, and in January 1846, the Sikhs attempted to cut the British lines of communication. To counter, the combined force of British, Indians, and Gurkhas was sent to intercept the Sikhs. The Sikhs were forced to retreat. The next month, a final battle was fought at Sobraon. Gurkha reinforcements from the Sirmoor and Nasiri Battalions took part in the battle. The Sikh army surrendered and peace agreement was reached in early March 1846.

=== Siege of Delhi (India, 1857) ===
The Siege of Delhi took place in June–September 1857. Troops from the British East India Company who had grievances against British officers came to Delhi. To suppress the revolt, the antecedents of the modern Brigade of Gurkhas were called. After Delhi was recaptured, the Queen's Truncheon was awarded to the battalion. Forces of the Nepalese Army also fought during the conflict; these were sent by Jung Bahadur Rana to assist the British.

=== Anglo-Bhutan War (Bhutan, 1864) ===
In 1864–1865, the British, Indian, and Gurkha forces launched a war against Bhutan in response to raids into British territory in the Anglo-Bhutan War and slights against envoys, initially capturing several forts with relative ease. However, Bhutanese counterattacks, especially at Dewangiri, trapped defenders by cutting off supplies, leading to a chaotic withdrawal and significant losses. Reinforcements eventually recaptured Dewangiri, and after several smaller engagements, hostilities ended with the return of lost artillery.

=== Second Anglo-Afghan War (Afghanistan, 1878–1880) ===
The battalion of 2nd Gurkha Rifles fought in the northern villages against the Afghans. After the war, Afghanistan came firmly under British influence.

=== Boxer rebellion (China, 1900) ===
The Gurkhas fought against Chinese forces in the Boxer Rebellion to suppress the uprising against foreign influence in China.

=== Third Anglo-Afghan War (Afghanistan, 1919) ===
The British Indian government declared war on Afghanistan on 6 May 1919. Gurkhas and Sikhs were sent to Landi Kotal for reinforcement.

=== Anglo-Iraqi War (Iraq, 1941) ===
On 18 April 1941, the 20th Indian Infantry Brigade landed at Basra with the 2nd battalion 8th Gurkha Rifles, 2nd battalion 7th Gurkha Rifles, and 3rd battalion 11th Sikh Regiment. They fought at various cities in Iraq.

=== Battle of Jitra (Malaysia, 1941) ===
In 1941 Gurkha army was involved in a battle against the Japanese in Malaysia. The battle was lost, and all armies were transferred to Singapore.

=== Battle of Wadi Akarit (Tunisia, 1943) ===
The Battle of Wadi Akarit took place on April 5 and 6, 1943 at Wadi Akarit in Tunisia. The purpose of the battle was to assist Allied forces. The Gurkha army took part in the battle under the 4th Indian Division. Lalbahadur Thapa was awarded a Victoria Cross in the battle for making a night assault at Fatnassa Heights.

=== Battle of Imphal (India, 1944) ===
The Battle of Imphal was fought in northern India in the region around the city of Imphal, the capital of the state of Manipur. The battle occurred from 12 March to 21 June 1944 between British and Japanese forces. Three battalions of the 10th Princess Mary's Own Gurkha Rifles were involved in the battle. 184 were left dead and 820 wounded. The Honour of Imphal was awarded to the Royal Gurkha Rifles, the antecedent regiment, after the battle.

=== Brunei revolt (Brunei, 1962–1966) ===
The first battalion of 2nd KEO Gurkha Rifles was the first armed force used against the Brunei Revolt in December 1962. The troop was sent to Brunei in December via airdrop. The Gurkhas fought against the Indonesian Regular Army in Sabah and Sarawak. The operation took four years in total. The campaign ended in 1966. In November 1965 Rambahadur Limbu received the Victoria Cross for attempting to rescue two wounded comrades.

=== Battle of Sylhet (East Pakistan, 1971) ===
In 1971, 4/5 Gorkha Rifles from the Indian army took part in the Battle of Sylhet in East Pakistan (now Bangladesh) against Pakistani brigades. The operation lead to the surrender of the Pakistani brigades on 16 December 1971.

=== Sri Lanka peacekeeping operation (Sri Lanka, 1987–1990) ===
On 1 October 1987, the 4/5 Gorkha Rifles from Indian Army were deployed as peacekeepers to Sri Lanka. However, they ended up in battle against the rebel Tamil Tigers. The Gurkha army first rescued 13 Sikh light infantry and a team of 10 para-commandos. After the rescue operation, the Tamil Tigers attacked the Gurkha army and a long conflict started. The operation continued up to 1990. During the period, the Indian army supplied arms to local Tamils to fight against the Tamil Tigers and a portion of the Gurkha army was appointed to train them. Due to substantial damage, the Indian army retreated from the operation, bringing the Gurkha army out of Sri Lanka. Prem Thapa was awarded the Param Vir Chakra for leading troops after the death of his superiors in one of the battles.

== South America ==
=== Falklands War (Falkland Islands, 1982) ===
On 2 April 1982, Argentinian troops invaded the Falkland Islands, a British territory in the South Atlantic, thus precipitating the Falklands War. In response, a naval task force sailed to retake the islands and, as part of the land battle, Gurkhas were assigned to take Mount William during which they suffered several casualties. All Argentine forces on the Falklands surrendered at the end of the war.

== Africa ==
=== North Africa (Libya, 1942) ===
Gurkhas were sent to hold the critical port of Tobruk; when it fell, they became German prisoners, experiencing losses in captivity. The remaining soldiers were sent to the mountains to hold off the Germans. The campaign ended in the surrender of Rommel's Africa Korps.

== Europe ==
=== Italy campaign (Italy, 1944) ===
Gurkha forces were sent to Italy in May 1943 to prevent the Germans from advancing. Italy surrendered when the Allied troops invaded, but German troops remained in the mountains of Italy. The Gurkhas reached Italy on 11 February 1944 as a part of the 4th Indian Division. They started an offensive on February 16 and 17. Both attacks were a failure, resulting in 20% casualties. On May 14 the Polish Division finally took the position. During the campaign, the Gurkhas took several mountains while losing 4,000 men.

=== Kosovo operation (Kosovo, 1999) ===
British Gurkhas under the auspices of NATO disarmed 70 fighters of the Kosovo Liberation Army. The Gurkha troops counterattacked after fighters of the Kosovo Liberation Army opened fire on them in the Kaçanik area. The operation ended with the Kosovar fighters surrendering with their weapons.
