= Gurkha Contingent Pipes and Drums Platoon =

Platoon in Singapore Police Force

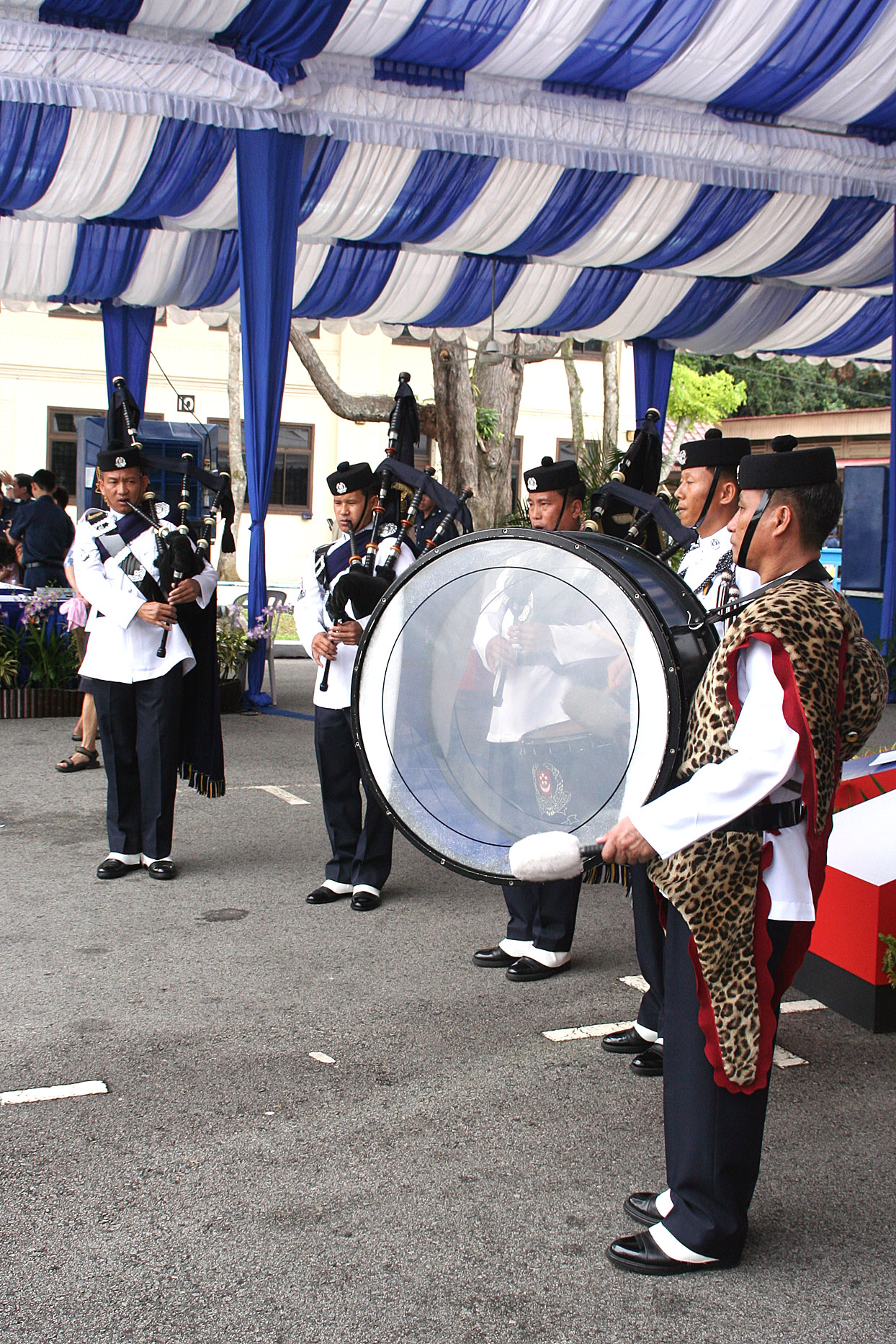
Members of the Singapore Police Force Gurkha Contingent Pipes and Drums Platoon performing at the Police Week Carnival 2005.

The Singapore Police Force Gurkha Contingent Pipes and Drums Platoon is a 35-strong platoon currently led by Inspector Bipin Yonjan. The Honorary Band President is Superintendent Tony Bergin, who is the Deputy Commander of the Gurkha Contingent. Formed in 1955 out of the Contingent's Gurkha officers, it includes officers trained as pipers, drummers and buglers.

The platoon performs regularly in partnership with the Singapore Police Force Band and the Women Police Pipes and Drums in combined performances locally as well as abroad. It has participated in the 1991 Edinburgh Military Tattoo, the 2001 Adelaide International Police Tattoo, the 2002 Malaysian Police and Military Tattoo in Kuala Lumpur and the 2005 Musikschau der Nationen in Bremen, Germany, in recent years either on its own or along with the other bands from the Singapore Police Force. In June 2014, it performed "Happy Birthday" in honor of the Queen's Official Birthday in the United Kingdom.

== See also ==
- Band of the Brigade of Gurkhas
- Deshon Ka Sartaj Bharat
- Military Music Wing
- Samman Guard
- Guard of honour
- Band and Bugles of The Rifles
