= Mount Vernon Camp =

Gurkha Cantonment

Coordinates: 1°20′21.41″N 103°52′44.79″E

Location of Mount Vernon Camp in Singapore

Mount Vernon Camp, also known as the Gurkha Cantonment, is an establishment of the Singapore Police Force built to house the training and residential facilities of the Gurkha Contingent's Gurkhas and their families.

Located at Mount Vernon near the now closed Bidadari Cemetery, it has undergone expansion on the hilly terrain, particularly with the introduction of modern, high quality high-rise housing blocks for the over 2,000 officers and their families-in-tow.

The road leading into the camp is named Kathmandu Road for the capital city of Nepal. Built as a self-contained complex due to security concerns to minimise movements into and out of the complex, it has its own shops, a kindergarten, playgrounds for the younger children, and a swimming pool which the families can access on weekends, all of which contingent commander Bruce M. Niven(2001-2006) equates to being a township all on its own. There are no schools in the camp.

Dwellers in the complex are not prohibited from leaving the camp or utilising services and facilities outside it. Throngs of school-going Nepalese children regularly leave and enter the camp everyday, wearing the uniforms of national schools. The camp's close proximity to Bartley Secondary School has seen a significant number of Nepalese children being enrolled there, although they can also be found in schools much further away as the children become gradually assimilated into Singapore society and culture. First Toa Payoh Primary School is one of the few primary schools the Gurkha's children are enrolled in.

The surrounding commercial outlets thrive on business from the Nepalese community based in Mount Vernon Camp, and it is a common sight to see officers doing their daily recreational runs around the major roads close to the camp.

Phase 2B of the complex expansion commenced in 2001, costing a total of S$42.2 million and adding 93,568m^{2} of largely residential space. Designed by PWD Consultants and built by the China Construction (South Pacific) Development Co., it was completed by 2003. The complex has continued to undergo physical upgrades, with the government setting aside another S$47.8 million for expansion works carried out from 2004 to 2006, as well as another complex expansion from 2015 to 2020. This was followed by an elevator refurbishment scheme for selected apartment buildings in-between 2023 and 2024 to improve the living conditions of the residents.

In 2024, Gurkha Cantonment celebrated its 75th anniversary by having a variety of events including the GC Mela(Carnival), a 75 km Ultra-marathon, functional fitness challenge, tree planting, reopening of the revamped heritage centre and banners on nearby lampposts, with the motto “Upholding the legacy of excellence”. An anniversary book was published by project officer SI Lalitkumar Khadka, and event advisor DSP Khoo Sze Hong, who were also in-charge for the revamping of the Gurkha Cantonment Heritage Centre.
