= Gurkha Contingent =

Singapore police unit

Coordinates: 1°20′21.41″N 103°52′44.79″E

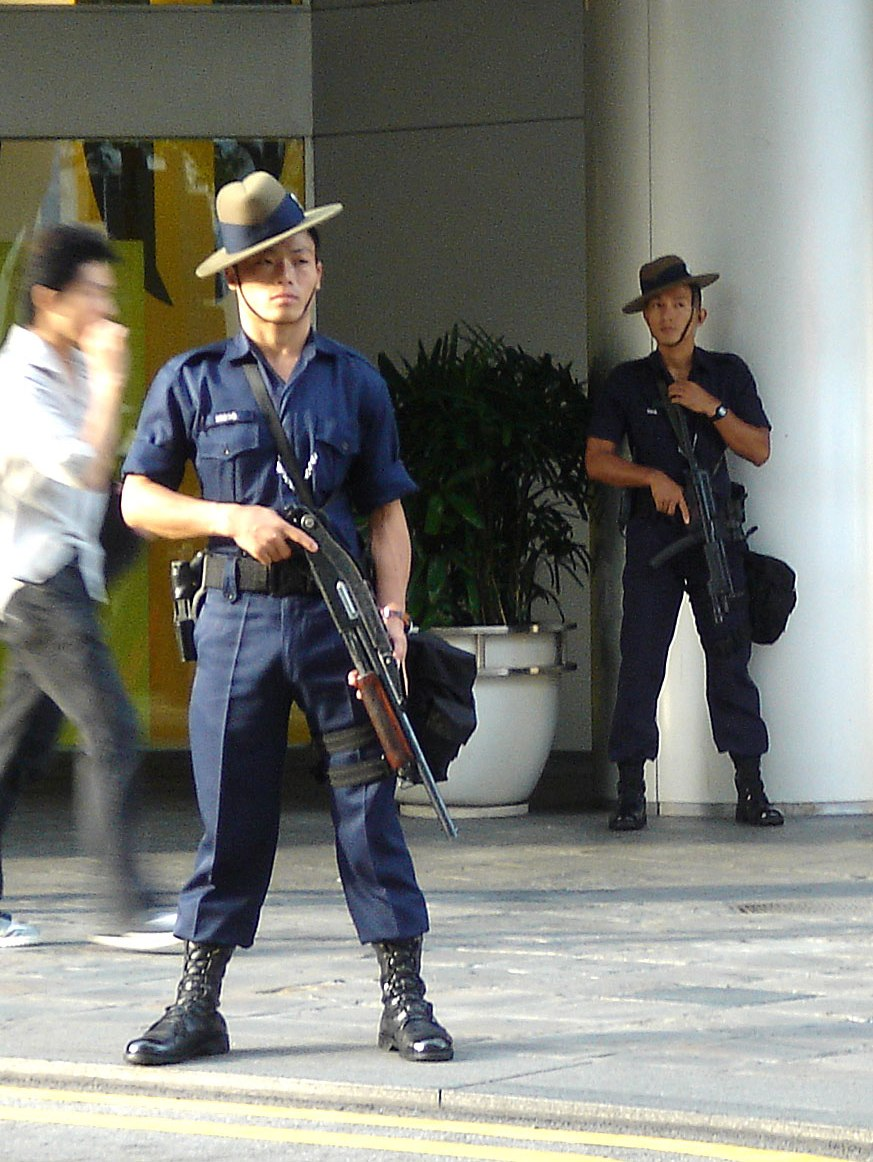
Gurkha Contingent police officers, performing guard duty during the 117th IOC Session.

The Gurkha Contingent (GC) is a line department of the Singapore Police Force (SPF) consisting primarily of Gurkhas from Nepal, recruited by the British Army under the purview of the Government of Singapore. It serves as a special guard force and counter-terrorist force.

== History ==
The Gurkha Contingent was formed on 9 April 1949 in the wake of Indian independence from the British Empire, with Captain Darshan Limbu, when the Gurkha regiments of the British Indian Army were divided between the Indian Army and the British Army as per the terms of the Britain–India–Nepal Tripartite Agreement.

Under the agreement, four Gurkha regiments from Nepal were transferred to the British Army while six joined the Indian army. India now has 39 Gorkha battalions serving in seven Gorkha regiments. Those transferred to the British Army were posted to other British colonies. In Malaya and Singapore, their presence was required in the Malayan Emergency, and they were to replace the Sikh unit in Singapore which reverted to the Indian Army on Indian independence.

Just a year after their formation, their presence became an asset when racial riots between the Malay and European communities broke out over the disputed custody of Maria Hertogh. The GC troopers were again activated when major rioting erupted all over the country between ethnic Malays and Chinese on the Prophet Mohammed's birthday from 21 July 1964 to September that same year.

At that time, their presence as a neutral force was important because local police officers were often perceived to be—or were even expected to be—biased towards their own ethnic groups when handling race-related issues, further fueling discontent and violence. Officers who attempted to carry out their duties impartially and in full accordance with the law also faced social backlash from their own ethnic communities, a difficult situation which could even lead to physical harm to individual officers.

In his autobiography, former Singapore Prime Minister Lee Kuan Yew recounted the use of the Gurkha Contingent as an impartial force at the time when Singapore had just gained independence. He wrote:

When I returned to Oxley Road [Lee's residence], Gurkha policemen (recruited by the British from Nepal) were posted as sentries. To have either Chinese policemen shooting Malays or Malay policemen shooting Chinese would have caused widespread repercussions. The Gurkhas, on the other hand, were neutral, besides having a reputation for total discipline and loyalty.

In April 2012, the GC suffered a scandal when nine of its officers were detained for being involved in a fight.

In September 2024, 5 Gurkha officers were convicted of operating illegal money transfer services.

== Manpower and training ==
Since its formation in 1949 with 142 men, the contingent has grown to over 1,800 in size in 2018. Young men are recruited in Nepal at the British Gurkha camp in Pokhara. About 320 are selected annually in December out of a pool of over 20,000 applications, split between the Gurkha Contingent and the British Army.

Some of the basic physical admission criteria in the recruitment camp include:

- Aged 17 1/2 to 21
- Minimum height of 160 centimetres (5 feet 3 inches)
- Minimum weight of 50 kilograms (110 lb; 7 st 12 lb)
- Chest circumference of 79 centimetres (31 inches) with minimum 5 centimetres (2.0 inches) expansion
- No applicants needing eyesight aids will be accepted.
- Generally good oral hygiene, with up to two fillings, false teeth or a single gap.

Applicants are expected to possess a minimum education level of SLC 3rd Division, equivalent to the GCE Ordinary Level. Upon registration, they have to go through a battery of physical and mental assessments prior to selection, including oral and written tests in the English language, a mathematics test, a board interview and medical examination. The annual selection process, which normally takes 17 days but is spread over four months due to conditions in Nepal, will then assign recruits to either the GC or the British Army.

Upon successful selection, GC trainees are flown to Singapore, and housed at the permanent base of the GC at Mount Vernon Camp where they will receive ten months of training before being deployed for duties. The training phase for GC officers is relatively unknown, although they have been known to use the jungles in Pulau Tekong for training. Arrangements with the Royal Brunei Police Force have allowed Gurkha officers to conduct jungle training in Brunei for several years. The GC also receives training from external agencies, including from the SAF Medical Training Institute for medical courses.

== Organisation and rank structure ==
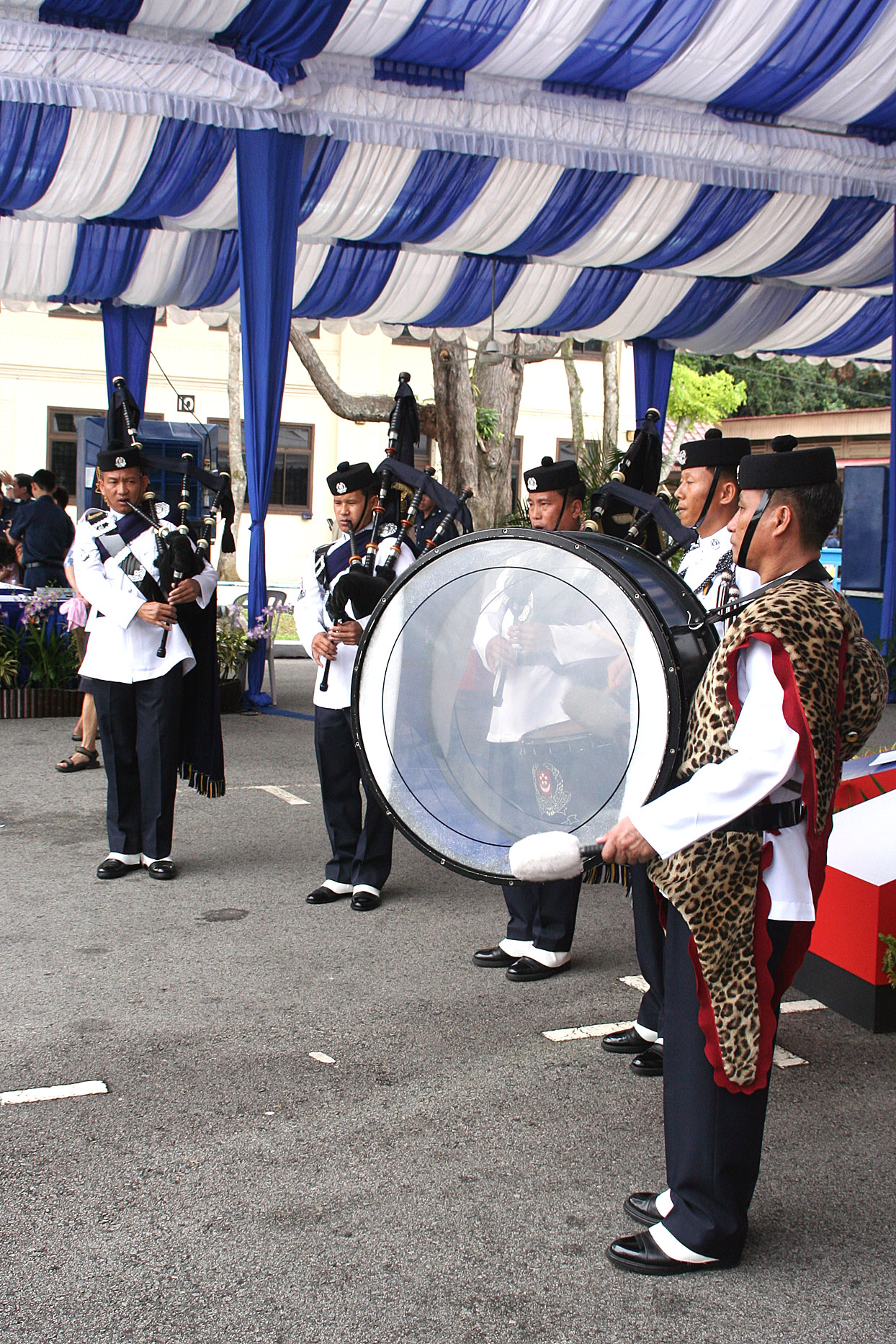
Members of the Singapore Police Force Gurkha Contingent Pipes and Drums Platoon performing at the Police Week Carnival 2005

There are a total of nine Gurkha Guard companies commanded by local and British officers. As a British colonial import, the first contingent commander was a British officer, and up to today, it remains the only military or police unit in Singapore to be headed by a British officer seconded from the British Army.

The current commander is Assistant Commissioner William Robert Kefford. The contingent also has its own Gurkha Band Contingent, the Gurkha Contingent Pipes and Drums Platoon, which is part of the Singapore Police Force Band.

Gurkha Contingent (GC) structure :

- A WING
  - 1 Guard COY
  - 2 Guard COY
- B WING
  - 3 Guard COY
  - 4 Guard COY
- C WING
  - 5 Guard COY
  - 6 Guard COY
- S WINGS
- Training WINGS

The rank structure of the GC has remained largely unchanged over the years, thus retaining several ranks which have since been abolished in the rest of the police force. It is currently the only unit to retain the rank of Chief Inspector, and to recruit new officers as Police Constables as opposed to regular officers in the rest of the SPF who start from a minimum rank of Sergeant.

== Deployment ==
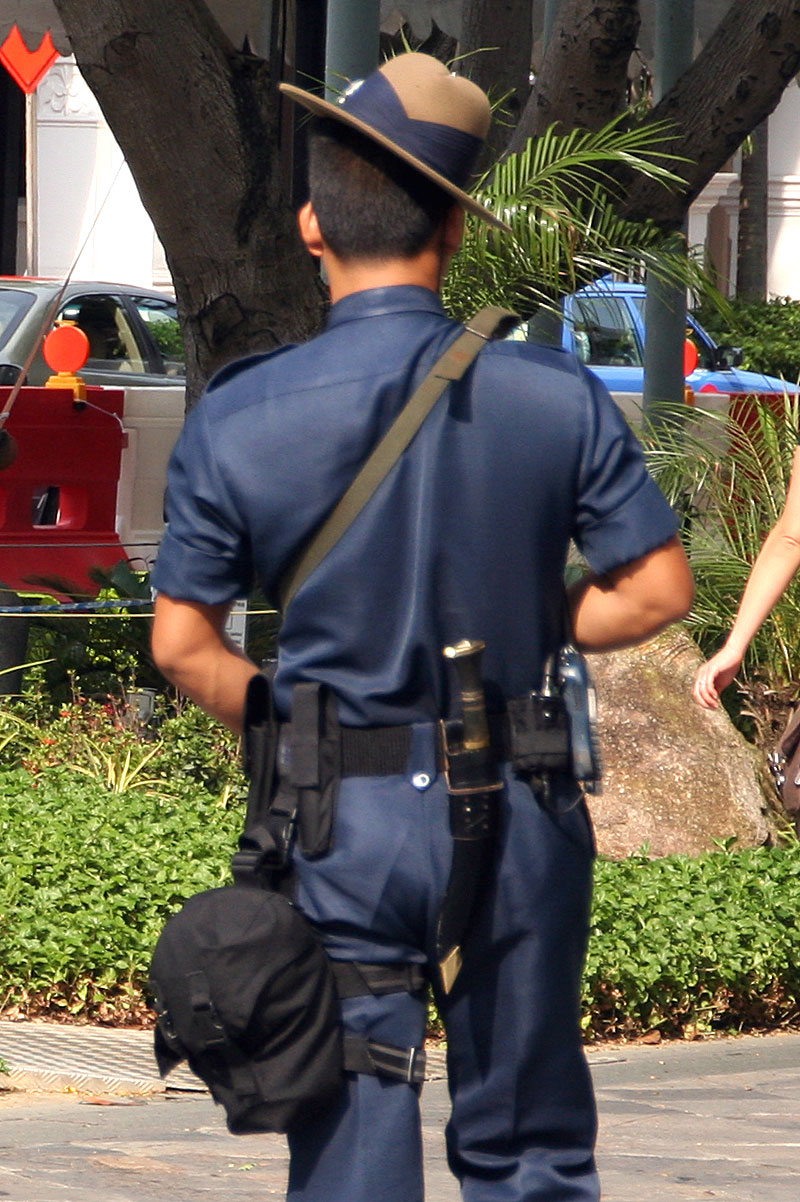
A Gurkha officer patrols around Raffles City during the 117th IOC Session. He is easily identified by the tilted Hat Terrai Gurkha and the kukri seen affixed to the back of his belt.

Before the September 11 attacks in 2001, the GC was seldom seen in public besides being stationed at key locations such as The Istana, and the homes of VIPs such as former Prime Minister Lee Kuan Yew and the President of Singapore. Only those who spoke English were assigned to protect VIP homes. They were also seen stationed at important foreign properties such as the British High Commission and installations which require added security such as the Currency House at Pasir Panjang.

Changing security concerns since 2001 has led to a more active deployment of GC troopers in recent years, and a review of their existing roles. Previously known for standing guard atop lookout towers at Changi Prison where the country's top criminals are housed, this role has since been outsourced to private auxiliary police forces in the mid-2000s with the liberalization of the private armed security industry.

Besides guarding key installations, Gurkha troopers are increasingly deployed during key national events. They are deployed during the annual National Day Parade, and complimented the police's stringent security measures during the 117th IOC Session held in Singapore in July 2005. They also watch over sealed ballot boxes during the country's general elections. Most recently, the GC was involved in the hunt for escaped detainee Mas Selamat bin Kastari and 2013 Little India riots. GCs are capable of VIP protection, and terrain tracking as well as public order incident response. The Contingent was also used to protect the Capella Resort venue which hosted the 2018 summit between Kim Jong-un and Donald Trump.

On 18 March 2004, three armed fugitives escaped from Johor, Malaysia, after committing armed robbery, and fled by a motorized sampan to Pulau Tekong. Over 700 personnel from the police and the SAF were activated, with the first fugitive captured by the Gurkha officers within 34 hours from the commencement of the search operation. The second fugitive was arrested by the Police Coast Guard's Special Task Squadron officers, while the last man was again caught by the GC six hours after the second arrest.

The GC has also contributed to Singapore's overseas security and humanitarian missions. For example, GC officers were part of a 40-man Singapore Police Contingent to the United Nations Transitional Administration in East Timor in 2000. They also joined a 30-man team to Iraq to help train about 1,500 local Iraqi trainers and police officers for three months before returning to Singapore on 19 September 2003.

== Social life and impact ==
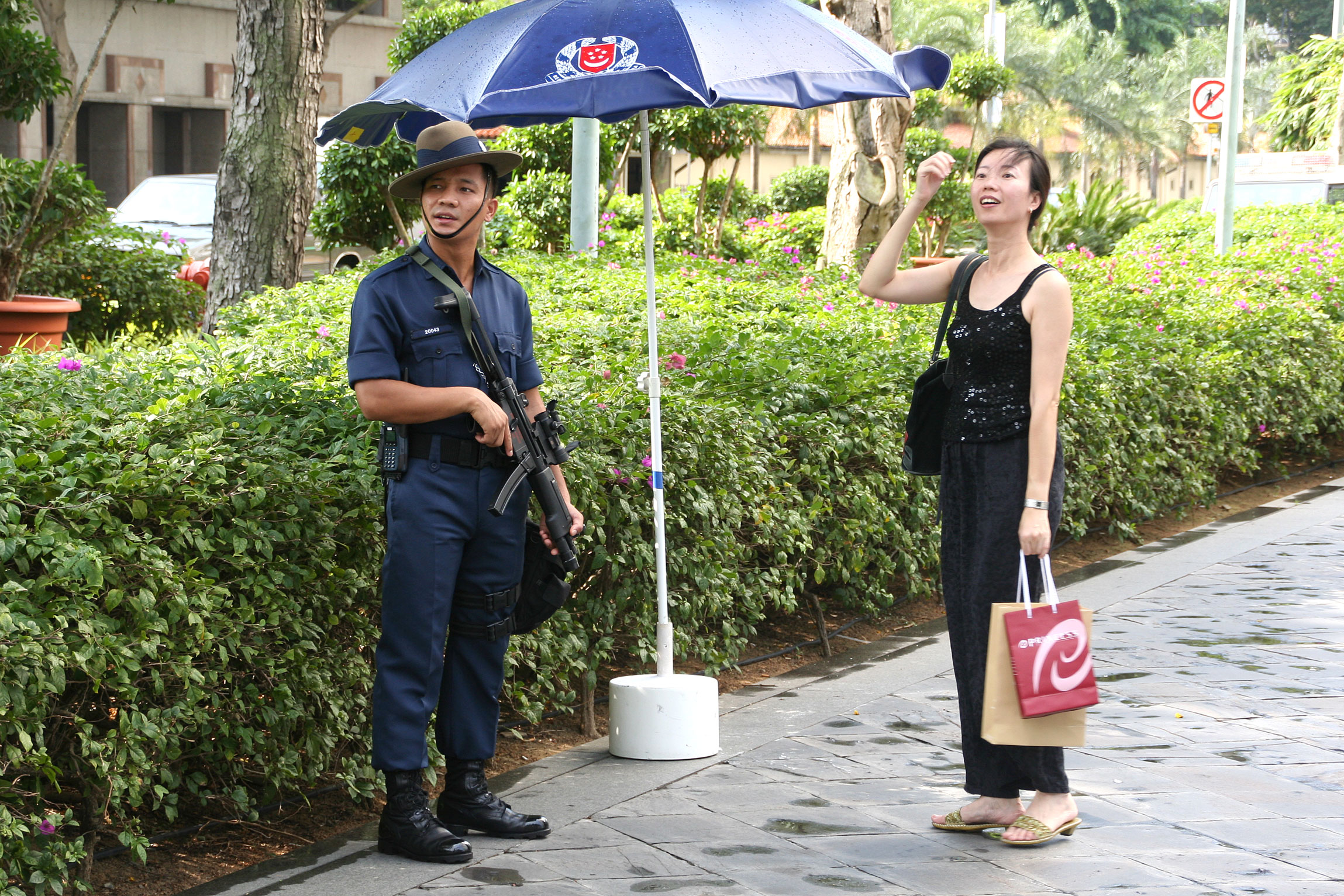
Gurkha Contingent officer at Raffles City during the 117th IOC Session giving directions to a member of the public. Their increased deployment in public areas has resulted in greater interaction between them and Singaporeans at large.

During the operation to separate the conjoined twins Ganga and Jamuna at the Singapore General Hospital in November 2001, the Gurkha community helped to raise funds for the medical procedure and daily expenses, accommodated the family at their Mount Vernon home for a period of time, and assisting in making logistical arrangements for the family's transportation and other needs.

== See also ==
- List of operation by Gurkha Army
- History and origin of Gurkha units
- British Indian Army (1858–1947)
- Gorkha regiments (India)
- Gurkha Reserve Unit (Brunei)
- Gurkha Regiment (United Kingdom)
  - Brigade of Gurkhas (British Army)
  - Royal Gurkha Rifles (British Army)
