= Singapore Police Force Band =

Musical band of Singapore police

Established in 1925, while the country was under British rule, the Singapore Police Force Band (SPF Band) is the oldest band in the Republic of Singapore. Along with SPF's transformation into a modern-day Police Force, the Band has in its more than 95 years of existence.

The SPF Band is a vehicle of the SPF that supports SPF's strategic partnership with the community through music and entertainment. It creates awareness of the SPF through public performances such as the annual National Day Parade (NDP)., Police Community Roadshows, Home Team Festivals and various collaborations with educational and charity institutions.

The Band currently consists of 78 musicians made up of regular and full-time national service officers led by the Director of Music, Superintendent of Police (1) Sulaiman Bin Abdul Wahab. On top of being dedicated musicians, the band members are also full-time police officers.

Besides encompassing a host of ensembles such as the Concert Band, Military Band, Fusion Quintet, Combo Band and Showband, the WPPD (Women Police Pipes and Drums) was formed in 1972 and had performed in various local and overseas events including the National Day Parade.

The SPF Band currently sports the following ensembles:

- Marching Band
- Fanfare Trumpeters
- Big Band
- Combo Band
- Brass Quintet
- Woodwind Ensemble
- Women Police Pipes and Drums (WPPD)
- Fusion Ensemble (established in 2019)
- SPF Duo
