= Benjamin Ursinus von Bär =

Prussian court preacher

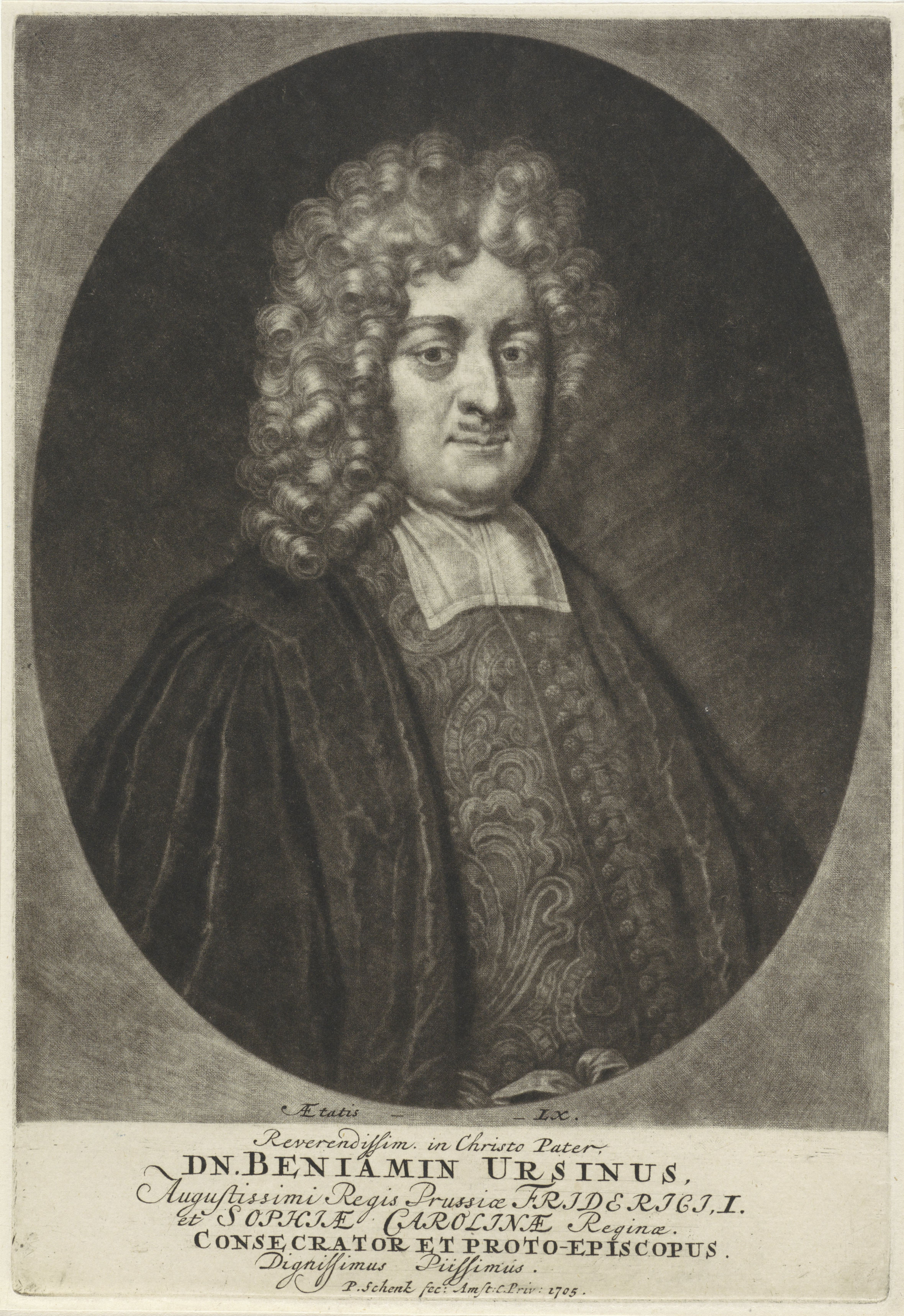
Benjamin Ursinus von Bär

Benjamin Ursinus von Bär (commonly spelled 'Baer'; February 12, 1646 - December 23, 1720) was the Court Preacher to the Elector of Brandenburg, and was a bishop of the protestant Reformed Church descendant from a family of clergymen.

== Early life ==
Ursinus was born into a family of high ranking clergymen at Lissa; his grandfather David Ursinus was Court Preacher to the Carolath Castle in Lower Silesia. Ursinus' father (also named Benjamin Ursinus) was the first Vice Rector in Lissa before becoming a pastor in 1648. Ursinus was raised in Danzig and was enrolled as a theology student in Heidelberg in 1663. Afterwards, on the suggestion of his teachers, he was ordained as a secret preacher in the secret Reformed Church of Cologne in 1667.

=== Court Preacher of Brandenburg ===
After his ordination, Ursinus became the Court Preacher to Frederick William, Elector of Brandenburg in 1670. After Frederick William's death, he retained his office under Frederick I of Prussia, under whom he gained greater prestige. He anointed him as King in Prussia in Königsberg in 1701. In 1703, Ursinus was invited to talks about uniting Protestant Churches in Prussia, which would cumulate a century later as the Old Prussian Union. In 1712, Ursinus baptised the Crown Prince's son Frederick, who would become known as Frederick the Great. Upon the ascension of Frederick William I, Ursinus' standing dropped significantly due to the king's militarist leanings, and his salary dwindled. Ursinus died in Berlin and was buried in Gütergotz in 1720.
