= Johannes Petzold =

German composer

Johannes Petzold (24 October 1912 – 19 May 1985) was a German church musician, composer of several hymnal songs and docent at the Thuringian Church Music School.

== Life ==
Born in Plauen, Vogtland, Petzold, son of a pattern draughtsman in the lace and curtain industry of his home town, studied education in Leipzig 1932–1935, majoring in music. One month after his matriculation he became a member of the "New Saxon Teachers' Association" (30 May 1932). As a result of the Gleichschaltung of the teachers' associations, he belonged to the Nationalsozialistischer Lehrerbund from the Tag der nationalen Arbeit On 7 July 1933, he joined the Sturmabteilung. After graduating, he worked as a primary school teacher in small villages in the Vogtland and Ore Mountains regions. As a "young teacher" he became a member of the National Socialist German Workers' Party with effect from 1 May 1937. (membership number 5,816,055, dated 15 June 1938).

Already at the beginning of his studies, he came into contact with the Singbewegung and took part in singing weeks with Alfred Stier and Hugo Distler. His lifelong friendship and collaboration with Samuel Rothenberg began in autumn 1932 with a joint choir tour through Saxony. Petzold's early compositions and texts were self-published until 1945.

On 26 March 1940, he married the community helper Hiltrud Schaale. She belonged to the Confessing Church and had come into conflict with the authorities and the Gestapo several times in connection with her work. Both were united by a craft-creative relationship with music. She also composed and wrote poetry, some of which he set to music.

In February 1940, he was called up for active military service. He took part in the war in Belgium and France as a soldier; he was discharged on 29 July 1941 as a "gunner in the reserves" because of a tuberculosis illness. For the same reason, his work as a teacher ended in March 1942.

Petzold spent the following years in hospitals and sanatoriums until he was able to work to a limited extent after a successful thorax operation and became cantor in Bad Berka / Thuringia in 1952. At the University of Music Franz Liszt Weimar he took part as a guest student in lessons in Tonsatz with Johann Cilenšek and continued his education in organ playing. In 1957 he was awarded the title of Kirchenmusikdirektor.

In November 1961, he was appointed to the Thuringian Church Music School in Eisenach as a lecturer in composition, history of music and ear training. In addition to his teaching activities, he took on numerous singing duties at singing weeks, choir meetings and community events. He retired in 1977.

Petzold died in Eisenach at the age of 72.

His son Dietrich Petzold (born 1954) is a violinist, composer and audio book director.

== Work ==
Petzold composed numerous melodies, canons, choral and wind settings, organ preludes, motets and cantatas. They are mostly included in collections, for example in song sheets of the Christlicher Sängerbund. Protestant, Catholic and free-church hymnbooks in Germany, Austria, Japan, Switzerland and Scandinavia contain his melodies. Among his best-known works is the melody to Jochen Klepper's Advent song Die Nacht ist vorgedrungen.

== Pieces ==
- Gelobt sei deine Treu. (Melody, 1937) Merseburger Verlag
- Die Nacht ist vorgedrungen. (melody, 1938) Bärenreiter-Verlag; EG 16, GL 220.
- Gott Vater, du hast deinen Namen. (Melody, 1941), EG 208.
- Gott, weil er groß ist (Canon, 1942) Merseburger Verlag; EG 411.
- Der hat sein Leben am besten verbracht (Canon, 1946) Merseburger Verlag.
- Dich, Schöpfer, lobt die ganze Welt. (melody and choral setting, 1947) Merseburger Verlag.
- Unser täglich Brot. (Cantata after texts by Arno Pötzsch, 1951) Strube-Verlag.
- Motetten aus Kirchenlied und Bibelwort. Evangelische Verlagsanstalt, Berlin 1962.
- Wunderbarer König. (Song cantata for choir, solo soprano, wind choir, solo trombone and organ, 1963) Wartburg Verlag, 2012.
- Das ist mir lieb, dass du mich hörst. (melody, 1966), EG 292.
- Es kommt ein Schiff, geladen (Nine variations for organ, 1969, not published).
- Ich will dem Herrn singen mein Leben lang. (Canon, 1969), EG 340.
- Ohren gabst du mir. (Melody, 1972), EG 236.
- Acht Chorverse für Tauf- und Segnungsgottesdienste und für den allgemeinen liturgischen Gebrauch. (1973) Singende Gemeinde Publishing House.
- Herr, unser Herrscher.. (Text and melody, 1975) Strube-Verlag; EG 270.
- Sonnengesang - Cantata after the Canticle of the Sun by Francis of Assisi, for children's choir, solo voices, flute and organ, 1975. Strube-Verlag, 1992.
- Stillung des Sturms. (Motet, 1975) Deutscher Verlag für Musik Leipzig (Breitkopf & Härtel).
- Ist Gott für mich. (Choral Fantasy for trumpet, unison choir and organ, 1975) Loosmann-Musikverlag, 2005.
- Wie die Träumenden werden wir sein (melody, 1985) Strube-Verlag.
- Gott sandte den Sohn (melody, 1985) Singende Gemeinde Publishing House; Hymnal of the Moravian Church 228.
- Psalmlieder und -motetten. Compiled by Hartmut Bietz. Evangelische Verlagsanstalt, Berlin 1987 / Strube-Verlag.
