= Church of Reconciliation =

Church of Reconciliation can refer to:

- Church of Reconciliation (Taizé)
- Church of Reconciliation (Berlin)
- Church of Reconciliation, Dresden
- Church of Reconciliation, Leipzig

== See also ==
- Church of Our Lady of Reconciliation, Liverpool
