= Sexuality of Frederick the Great =

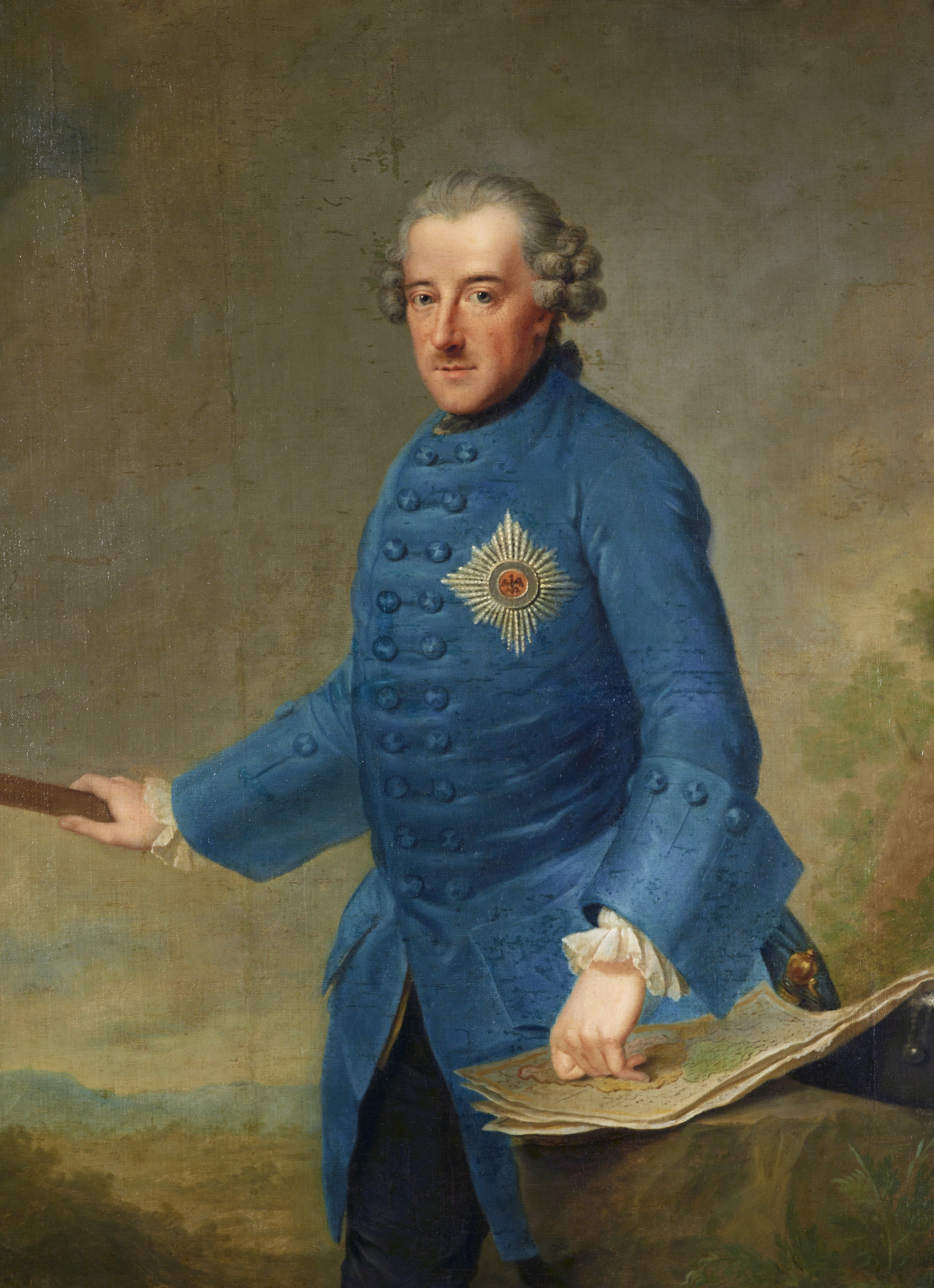
Portrait of Frederick II of Prussia by Johann Georg Ziesenis (1763).

Most modern scholars agree that Prussian King Frederick the Great (1712–1786) was primarily homosexual. However, the nature of his actual relationships remains a source of speculation. For instance, there is no consensus on the actual number of Frederick's male lovers. Some researchers believe that he may have only lived out his same-sex love platonically. This latter point is contradicted by some statements by the king himself and by his contemporaries, Voltaire and Casanova.

Though he had an arranged marriage, Frederick produced no children and was succeeded by his nephew. His favoured courtiers were exclusively male, and his art collection celebrated homoeroticism. Persistent rumours connecting the king with homosexual activity circulated around Europe during his lifetime, but there is less surviving definitive evidence of any sexual relationships of his, homosexual or otherwise. However, in July 1750, the Prussian king teasingly wrote to his gay secretary and reader, Claude Étienne Darget: "Mes hémorroïdes saluent affectueusement votre v[it]" ('My hemorrhoids affectionately greet your penis'), which strongly suggests that he was sexually involved with men.

Furthermore, at an advanced age, the king advised his nephew in a written document against passive anal intercourse, which from his own experience was "not very pleasant". That he actually did desire men is also clear from statements by his famous contemporaries, Voltaire and Giacomo Casanova, who personally knew him and his sexual preferences. Significantly, Voltaire nicknamed Frederick "Luc". When read backwards, it means cul (the vulgar French term for 'anus' or 'butt'). According to Wolfgang Burgdorf, "Various foreign envoys ... reported on Frederick's 'unnatural vice'. ... None of them bothered with the idea of influencing the Prussian court's policy by launching a new mistress. Saxony and France, however, repeatedly managed to place good-looking young men near him. Sanssouci was a women-free zone during the Friderican era." Frederick himself once shocked a dinner party with an offensive rant against "ghastly women you smelled ten miles around."

Frederick's sexuality was rejected by professional historians for centuries after his death, but was extensively discussed in the first decades of the twentieth century, with LGBT researchers and publications in Weimar Germany celebrating him as a queer predecessor and pioneer.

== Possible homosexual relationships ==
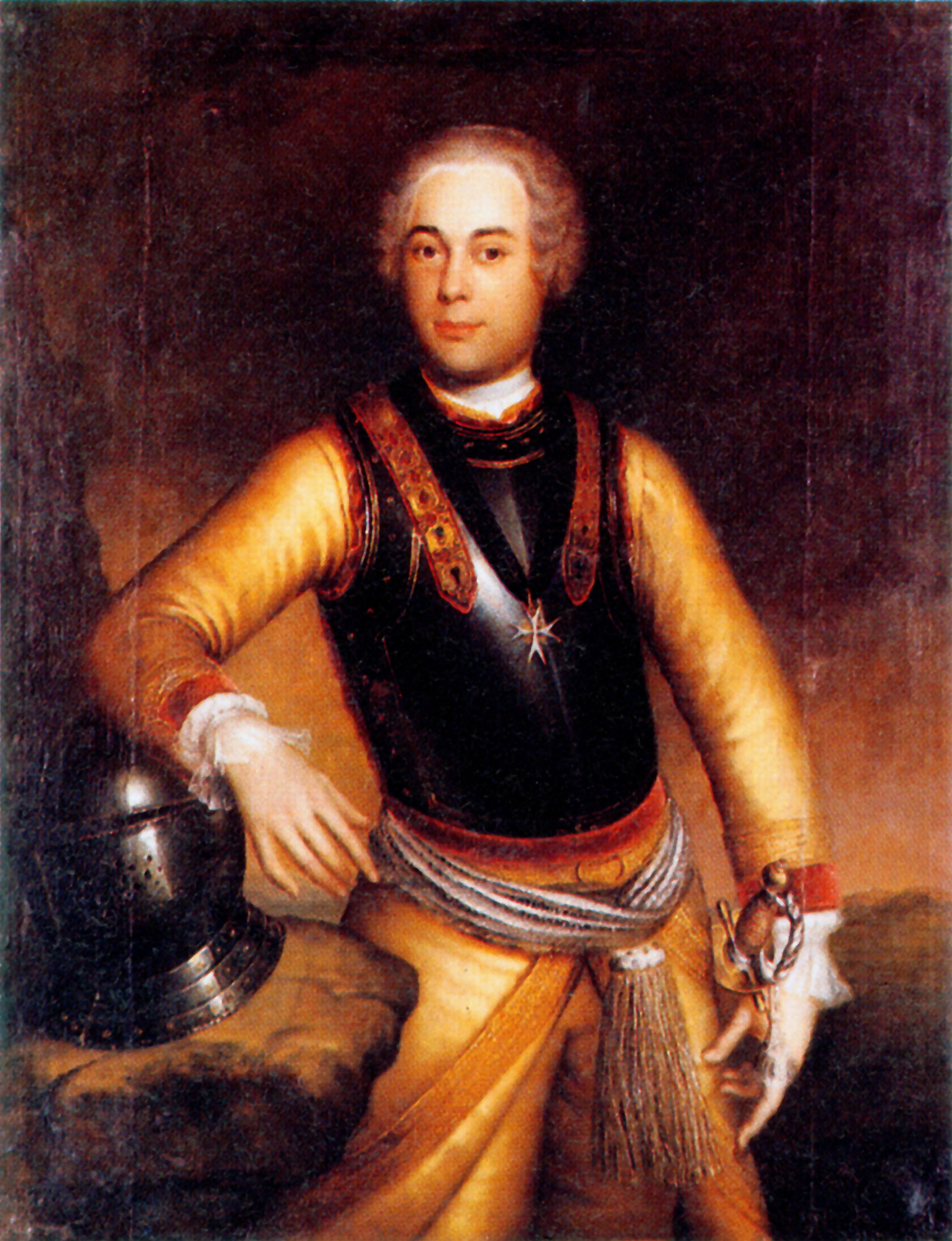
Hans Hermann von Katte

As a young crown prince, Frederick confided to his mentor, Generalfeldmarschall Friedrich Wilhelm von Grumbkow, that he felt too little attracted to the female sex to be able to imagine entering into a marriage. At age 16, Frederick seems to have embarked upon a youthful affair with Peter Karl Christoph von Keith, a 17-year-old page of his father. Rumors of the liaison spread in the court, and the "intimacy" between the two boys provoked the comments of Frederick's sister Wilhelmine who wrote, "Though I had noticed that he was on more familiar terms with this page than was proper in his position, I did not know how intimate the friendship was." Rumors finally reached King Frederick William, who cultivated an ideal of ultramasculinity in his court, and derided his son's supposedly effeminate tendencies. As a result, Keith was dismissed from his service to the king and sent away to a regiment by the Dutch border, while Frederick was sent to the king's hunting lodge at Wusterhausen in order to "repent of his sin".

King Frederick William may have thought that Frederick's relationship with Hans Hermann von Katte, another royal page who had succeeded Keith as Frederick's favorite, was also romantic, a suspicion which may have played a role in Katte's receiving a death sentence. Frederick himself only escaped a death sentence thanks to Emperor Charles VI's intervention. A contemporary courtier, Karl Ludwig von Pöllnitz, reports that Katte, eight years his senior, and Frederick treated each other “like a lover with his mistress.” Princess Wilhelmine wrote about Katte: "He played the role of a free spirit and took his life to excess; Great ambition and arrogance went hand in hand with this vice. Such a favorite was far from dissuading my brother from his aberrations".

While confined to Kustrin after the Katte affair, Frederick formed an intimate friendship with Michael Gabriel Fredersdorf, with whom Frederick romantically corresponded and for whom he demonstrated frequent concern. Fredersdorf initially became Frederick's valet, and when Frederick became king he was provided with an estate and acted as factotum and, as some have said, as an unofficial prime minister. In 1789, Frederick's garden inspector and Oberhofbaurat [head of the planning department and building control office] Heinrich Ludewig Manger described Fredersdorf as "the king's darling at the time". Historian Eva Ziebura says: "The two of them probably had sex at the beginning". Later they exchanged very intimate letters about their issues with constipation, potency issues, etc. Another intimate confidante was his equerry: "No lover can be more agreeable and obliging than Frederick with Dietrich von Keyserling", said a councillor of war. He was nicknamed “Caesarion” and was promoted from equerry to adjutant general. Another favorite was Lieutenant General Friedrich Rudolf von Rothenburg, who took part in the Round Table until his death in 1751 and regularly stayed in one of Sanssouci's guest rooms, which is still called the Rothenburg Room today. The king liked to take good-looking soldiers into his personal service. Numerous young pages also served at his court.

In 1746, Frederick wrote mocking letters to his rather openly gay brother, Prince Henry of Prussia, which were characterized by jealousy for the "handsome Marwitz", a young royal page. One of Henry's favorites, the Queen's chamberlain, Ernst Ahasverus Heinrich von Lehndorff, also recalls this story in his memoirs. The king wrote to his brother on March 3, 1746, from Potsdam: "Your little darling is doing very well and if he stays well behaved, you will see him again soon. At the moment he yearns for love and composes elegies in your honor full of hot kisses, which he intends to give you on your return. I advise you to conserve your strength so that you have enough to assert your love." He also warned his brother about certain young men at court or among the officers he believed to suffer from gonorrhea.

== Voltaire ==
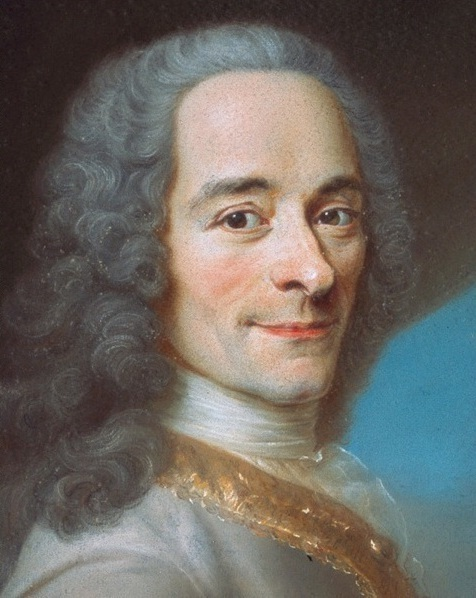
Voltaire, c. 1736, (Maurice Quentin de La Tour)

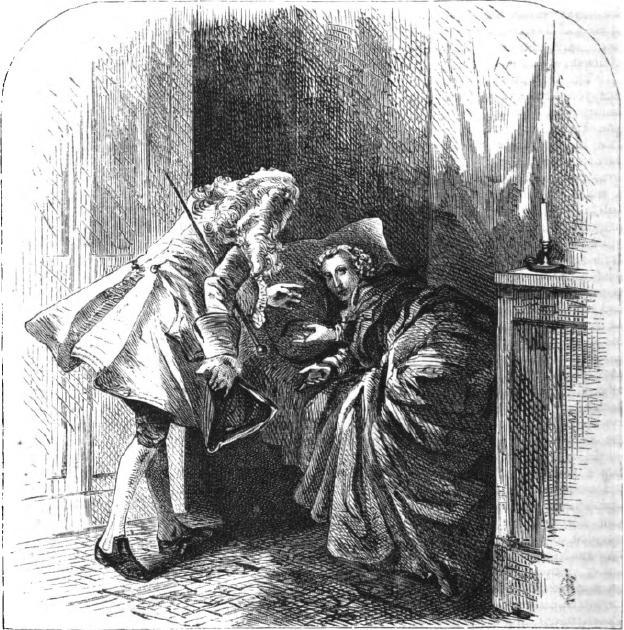
Cartoon on Frederick's first interview with the philosopher Voltaire (left) at Moyland Castle in the Duchy of Cleves

Frederick invited the French philosopher Voltaire to live with him at Potsdam almost immediately after his accession to the throne. Voltaire, who was in a personal creative crisis, was happy to accept the invitation. He only lived in the City Palace for a short time before renting his own house, first in Potsdam and later in Berlin. Their literary correspondence and friendship, which spanned almost 50 years, had begun a few years earlier as a flirtation and maintained a mutual intellectual fascination. Voltaire had just recently distributed Frederick's treatise Anti-Machiavel in Amsterdam to great popularity. Although Voltaire was occasionally thought to have been involved in same-sex relations, especially as a young man, it is highly doubtful whether the two had an intimate relationship. Occasionally to be read such claims were probably meant more polemically than seriously and are mainly due to the exuberant tones of their correspondence which were customary at the time. It wasn't Voltaire's (not particularly attractive) appearance that attracted Frederick, but rather his spirit that outshone Europe, which the young crown prince had recognized early on and now wanted to use for his own glory. Frederick wanted to adorn himself with one of the leading European intellectuals. He also appreciated the witty conversation in French and hoped the philosopher would not only enrich the royal academy but also the royal table (which always consisted only of men, just like his father's famous "tobacco club").

Frederick was a passionate supporter of the Enlightenment and Voltaire was its greatest spokesman. This included, for example, the abolition of criminal liability for homosexual acts. Frederick however did not abolish it, but unlike under his father, no death sentence was carried out. As early as 1725, Voltaire had brought about the release of Abbé Desfontaines, incarcerated for sodomy, from prison, an act the latter had repaid with ingratitude. Later, in his Dictionnaire philosophique (1752) Voltaire wrote an article about Love in the manner of Socrates, including a list of historical persons who were inclined towards homoerotic love. The final sentence reads: «Enfin je ne crois pas qu’il y ait jamais eu aucune nation policée qui ait fait des lois contre les mœurs» (After all, I don't think there was ever any civilized nation that enacted laws against mores).

However, Frederick found Voltaire difficult to live with in person. In addition, Frederick was often annoyed by Voltaire's many quarrels with his other friends. Voltaire's angry attack on Maupertuis, the President of Frederick's academy, in the form of a pamphlet, Le Diatribe du Docteur Akakia (The Diatribe of Doctor Akakia) provoked Frederick to burn the pamphlet publicly and put Voltaire under house arrest, after which Voltaire left Prussia. When Voltaire left, he took with him poems by Frederick mocking other rulers that could compromise Frederick and limit his political options. Frederick had his agents detain Voltaire in Frankfurt am Main on his way back to France in May 1753 and forced him to surrender the poems. Voltaire later claimed that the envoys had also stolen much of his money and had behaved disrespectfully towards his niece who accompanied him. This episode, which was somewhat exaggeratedly described as a “lover's quarrel,” cooled the friendship between Frederick and Voltaire.

When in 1753, the anonymous writing “Vie privée du roi de Prusse” or “Idée de la personne, de la manière de vivre et de la cour du roi de Prusse Frederic II.” was published by - presumably - none other than Voltaire, with correspondingly delicate hints, Frederick wrote to his representative in London, Mitchell: “As to this libelous little book, of which you tell me that manuscripts are in circulation in England, I tell you not to bother with it, and neither should you reveal another word about it. […] Besides, I don’t care what obsessed people write about me as long as the well-being of my state doesn’t suffer.”

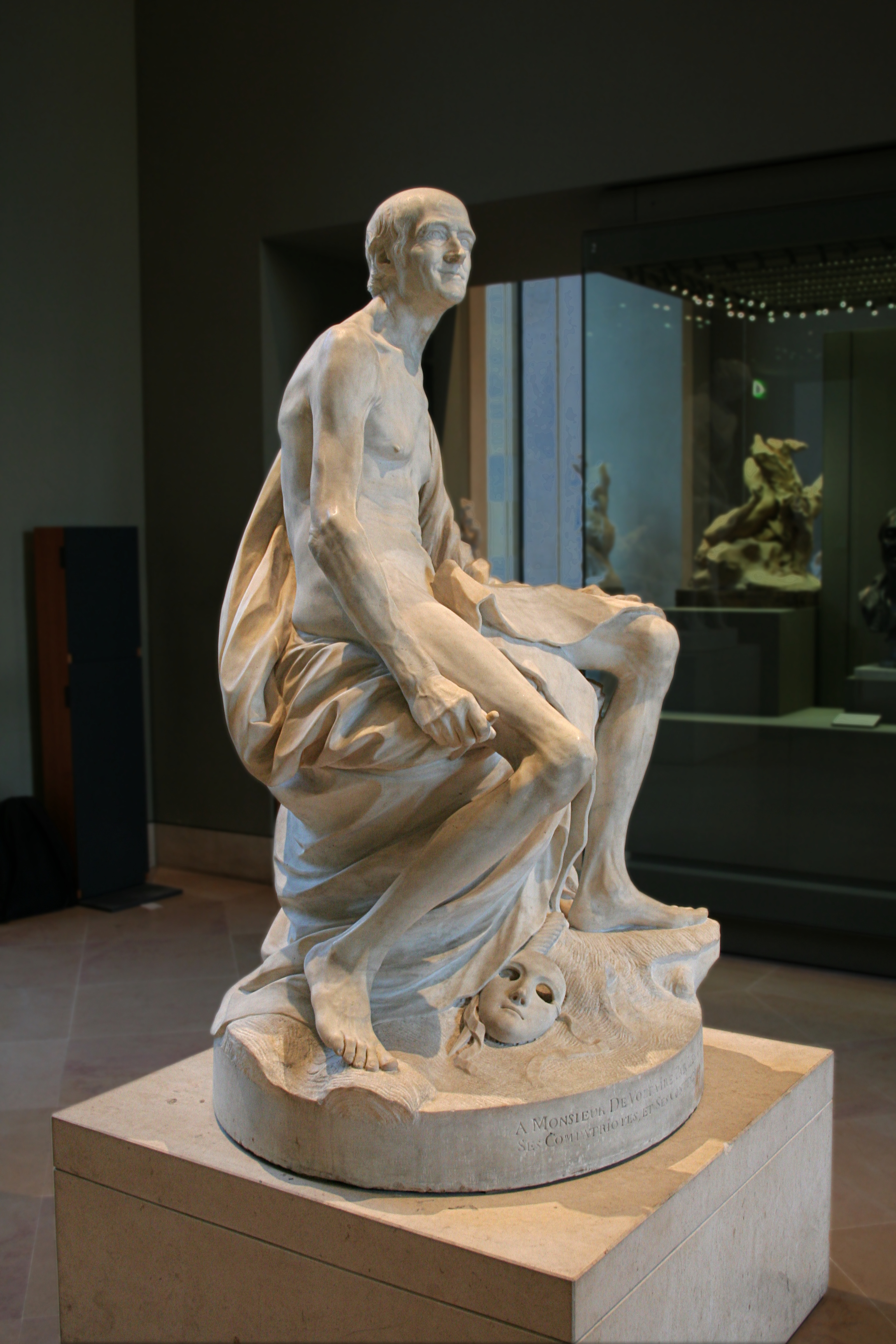
Voltaire naked (1776, Louvre)

In his memoirs of 1759, Voltaire lashed out at Frederick with malice and perfidy in order to avenge his quarrels during his time in Potsdam and in particular his ignominious internment in Frankfurt in 1753. The pamphlet also contains plenty of mockery of the homosexuality of the king and many of his courtiers, along with all sorts of risqué details, like the king's eyes being drawn to the male dancers' legs in ballet, Fredersdorf serving the king "in more ways than one to encourage him", etc. Goethe, who read these memoirs not without pleasure, called them "the model of all scandalous writings". In these Mémoires, he explicitly detailed the homosexuality of Frederick and his closest social circle. He writes: "when His Majesty was dressed and booted, the Stoic gave some moments to the sect of Epicurus; he had two or three favorites come, either lieutenants of his regiment, or pages, or haidouks [Hungarian infantrymen], or young cadets. They took coffee. He to whom the handkerchief was thrown stayed another quarter of an hour in privacy." A copy of the manuscript was stolen, and after Voltaire's death, pirated excerpts from it were published in Amsterdam in 1784 as The Private Life of the King of Prussia. "It was from this text that European readers not only came to believe that Frederick had homosexual desires, but that he was the 'passive partner' in sexual encounters with men." Publicly, Frederick acted unconcerned about the revelations. However, he had the publication of The Private Life suppressed in France, and attempted to suppress it elsewhere as well.

In 1757, on Voltaire's initiative, Frederick's sister Wilhelmine arranged for a resumption of correspondence between him and the king, who initially appeared brittle and had replies written by a secretary. But Voltaire's contact with the Prussian king seemed essential for his prestige in France, especially since the philosopher was still ignored at the court of Versailles. Gradually they exchanged polite letters again. Eventually both aired their mutual recriminations, and remained on friendly terms until Voltaire's death in 1778. When Suzanne Necker raised funds for a statue of Voltaire in 1770, the king also donated to it. The famous statue of the naked philosopher by Jean-Baptiste Pigalle (1776) can now be seen in the Louvre.

== Frederick's writing and predilection for homoerotic artworks ==
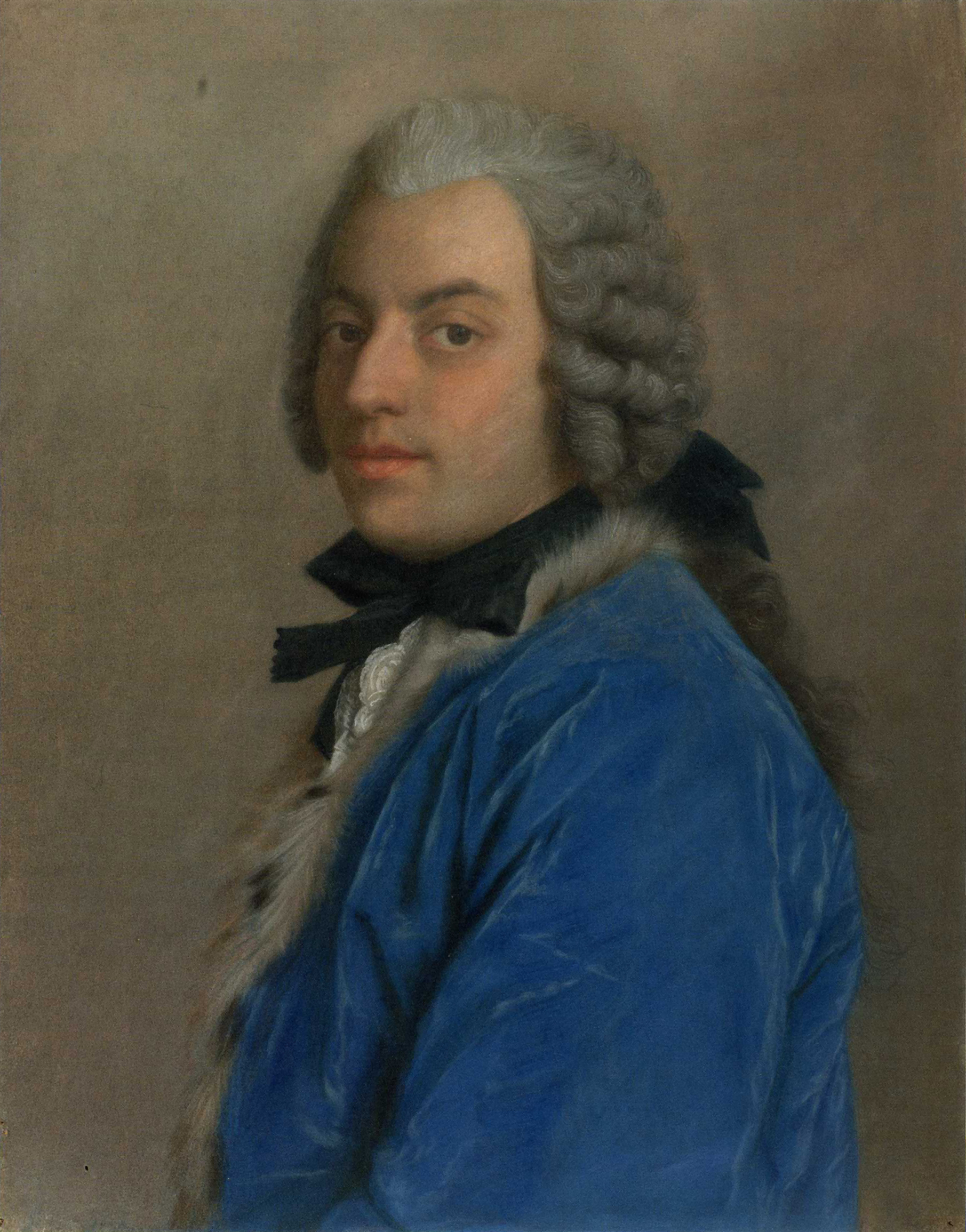
Francesco Algarotti

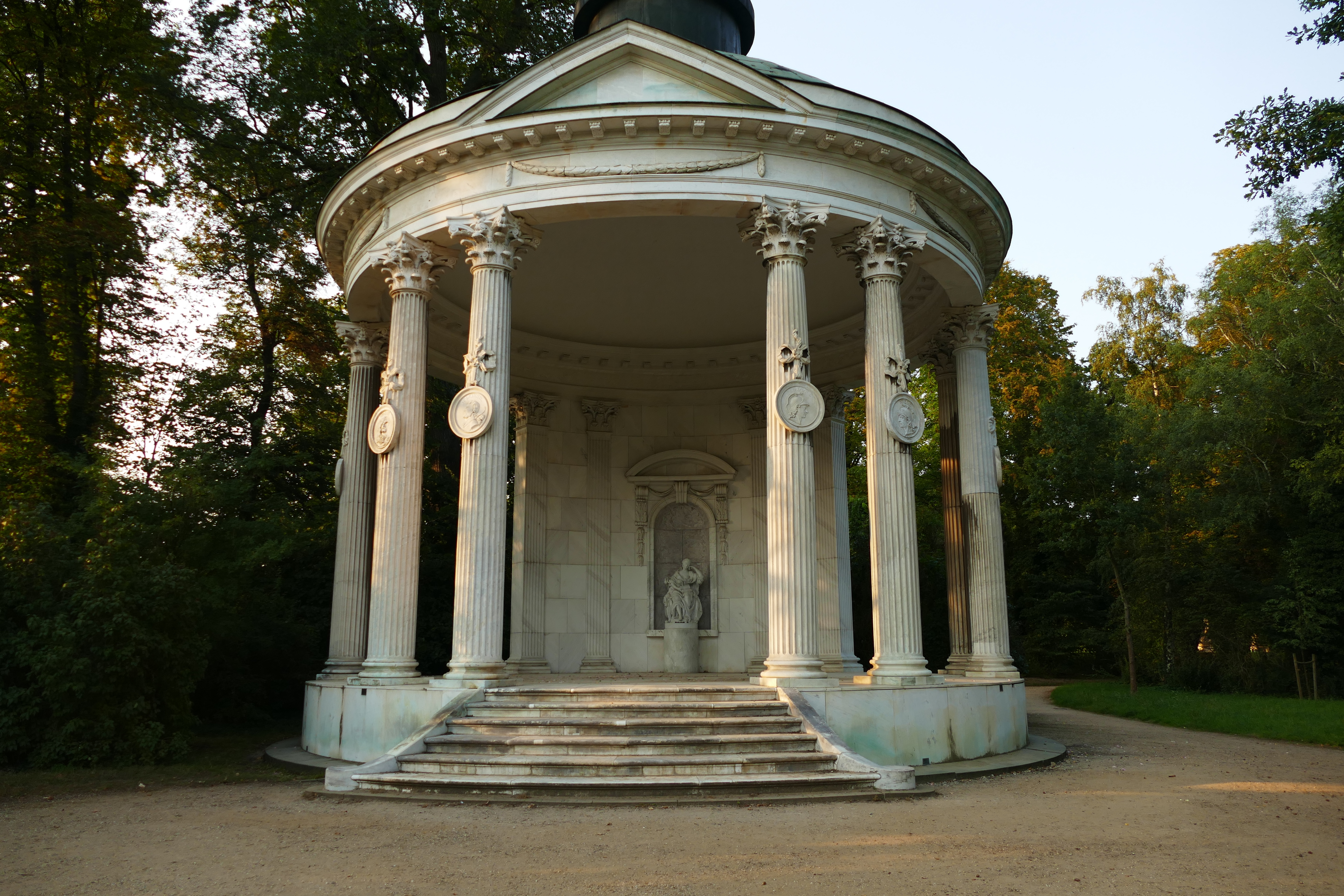
Frederick's Temple of Friendship at Sanssouci

In 1739, Frederick met the bisexual Venetian philosopher Francesco Algarotti, and they were both infatuated. Frederick planned to make him a count. Challenged by Algarotti that northern Europeans lacked passion, Frederick penned for him an erotic poem, La Jouissance (ambiguously meaning "the pleasure" or "the orgasm"). This poem was written in 1740 and only discovered in 2011 in a Berlin archive. It imagined what some have described as Algarotti in the throes of sexual intercourse with another partner, a female named Chloris. Not all Frederick scholars have interpreted the poem in such a way; it has also been suggested as describing a liaison between Frederick and Algarotti, especially since the latter was known as "Frederick's swan". Similar poems were written by Frederick. For instance, the fourth canto of his mock-heroic poem Le Palladion (1749) describes the homosexual adventures of his reader Claude Étienne Darget and includes the following blasphemous lines: "The good Saint John, what do you think he did / To induce Jesus to sleep with him in his bed? / And don’t you feel that he knew his Ganymede." In another verse he calls Julius Caesar the "wife of all Romans". However, none of these poems, including La Jouissance, unequivocally exposes Frederick as being involved in such affairs, though they do highlight his homoerotic artistic tendencies.

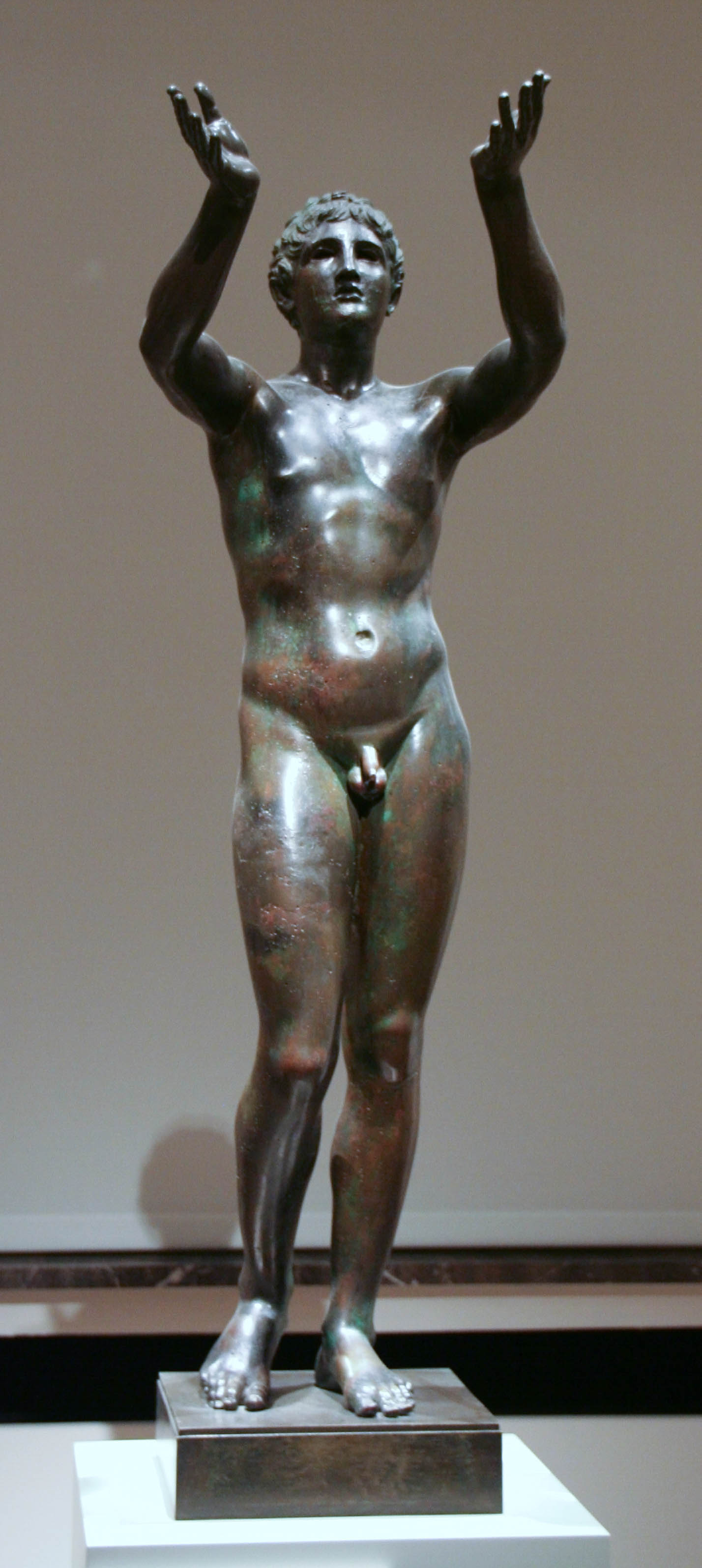
Berlin Adorant, acquired by Frederick and dated to 300BC.

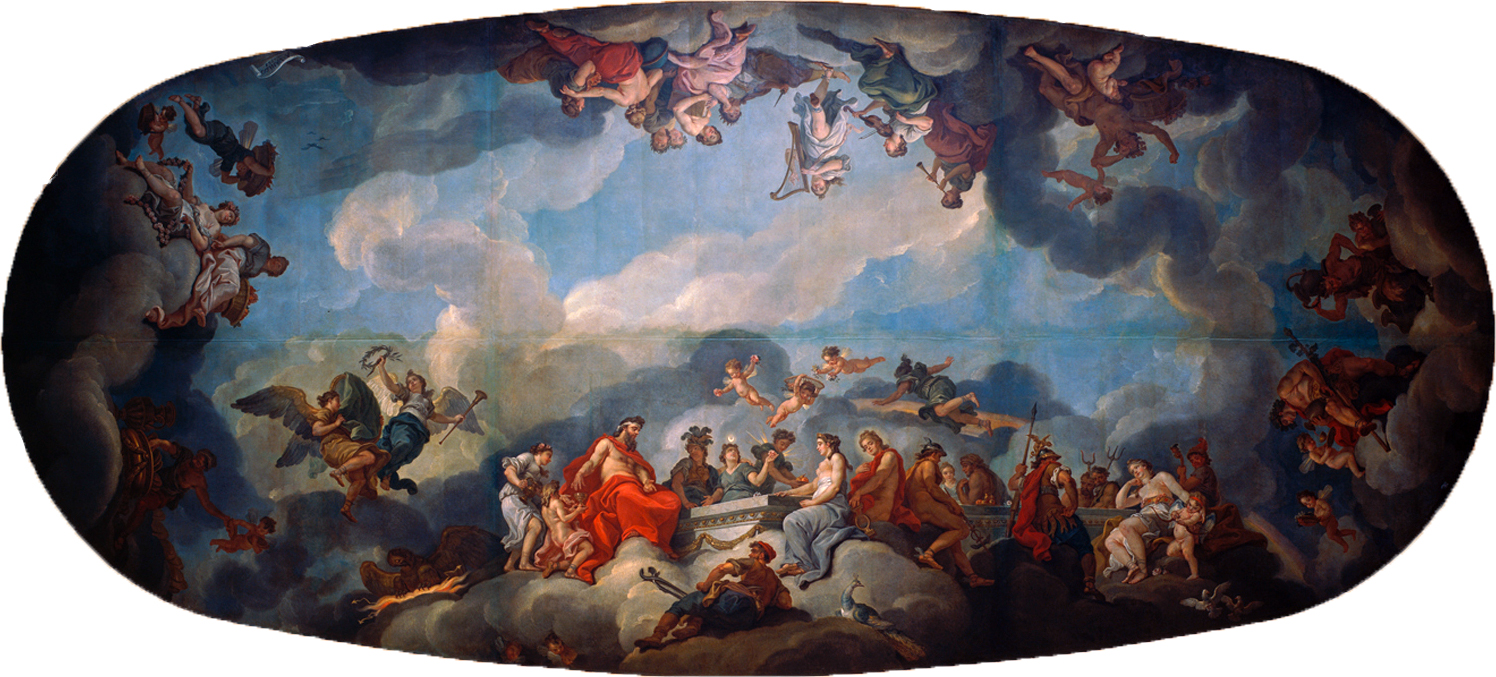
The fresco Introduction of Ganymede to Olympus by Charles-André van Loo in the New Palace, Potsdam.

Frederick also filled his palaces with erotic artworks that reflected his longing for homosexual relationships. The palace gardens at Sanssouci include a Temple of Friendship (built as a memorial to his sister, Wilhelmine) celebrating the homoerotic attachments of Greek Antiquity, the columns are adorned with four medallions representing Orestes and Pylades, Nisus and Euryalus, Heracles and Philoctetes, Theseus and Pirithous. In the New Palace, a showcase palace also located on the grounds of Sanssouci, Frederick kept the fresco Ganymede Is Introduced to Olympus by Charles Vanloo: "the largest fresco in the largest room in his largest palace", in the words of a biographer. In 1747, the king acquired the antique bronze statue of the nude Berlin Adorant, which he thought to represent Antinous, the supposed lover of the Roman emperor Hadrian. The statue was placed directly opposite Frederick's office window at Sanssouci. The archaeologist Johann Joachim Winckelmann, a pioneering Hellenist and rather open homosexual, visited Potsdam in 1752 and wrote: "I have seen Athens and Sparta in Potsdam and am filled with an adoring reverence towards the divine monarch", adding: "I have enjoyed lusts that I will never enjoy again".

After his defeat at the Battle of Kolín, Frederick wrote in a letter: "La fortune m'a tourné le dos ... [E]lle est femme, et je ne suis pas galant." This has been translated as "Fortune has it in for me; she is a woman, and I am not that way inclined." The original phrase "je ne suis pas galant" is somewhat ambiguous. While it would not be inaccurate to translate it as "I am not a lover/suitor (of women)", it could also be translated as the rather less suggestive, "I am not chivalrous".

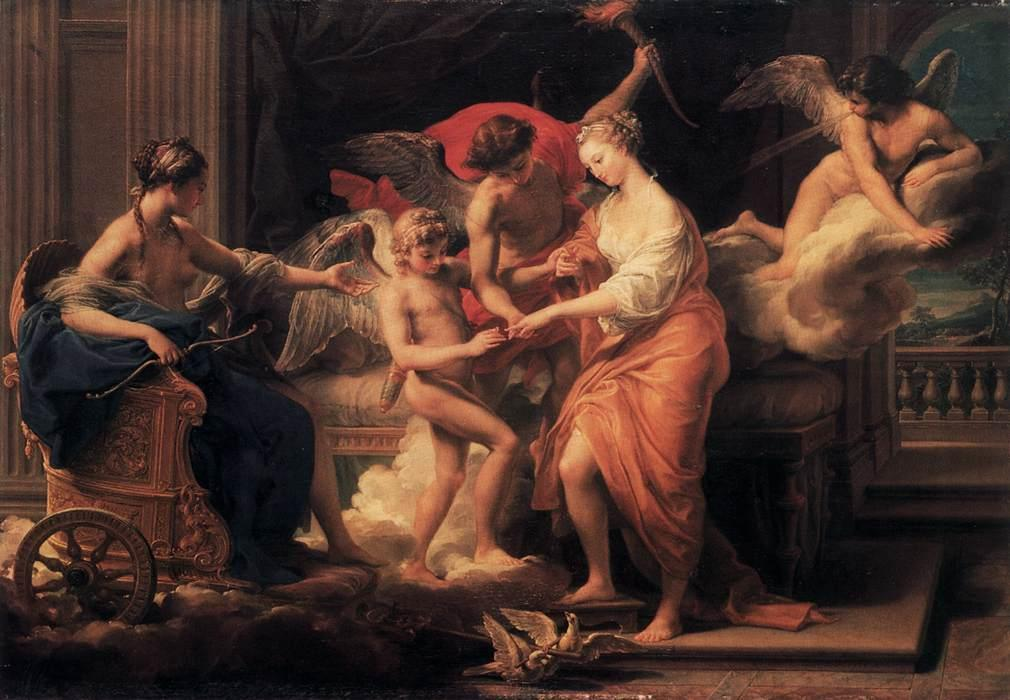
Pompeo Batoni: The Marriage of Cupid and Psyche (1756)

The following explanation can be read on the SPSG website: “Love was also considered erotic, but in public and literary terms it appeared to be more enthusiastic, asexual, platonic. Sexuality, on the other hand, was practiced in the 18th century with a freedom that may surprise us today. The distinction between heterosexuality, homosexuality or bisexuality did not play the role that it should have played since the 19th century. Sexual contacts between older people and much younger people were common and corresponded to common behavior, at least in noble circles; promiscuity was the order of the day. The visual and performing arts of the time reflect this, but the traditional writings and even pornographic depictions leave nothing to be desired.” And further: “Frederick also liked to buy (paintings by) Pompeo Batoni (1708–1787). It is reported that his specially commissioned picture The Marriage of Cupid and Psyche from 1756 accompanied him throughout the entire Seven Years' War and was considered one of his favorite pictures. In any case, the pictures contain numerous of the cheerful so-called Mignons – sweethearts – who apparently matched the king's taste for young, pretty pages.”

== Possible heterosexual relationship ==
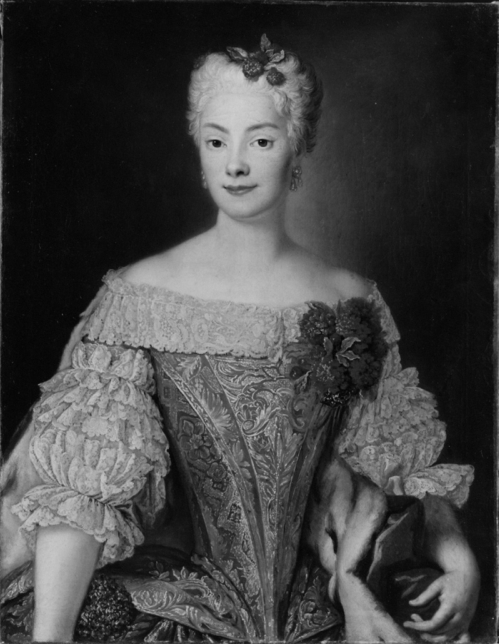
Anna Karolina Orzelska, believed by some to have been Frederick's only heterosexual partner

While there is no extensive documentation of Frederick having any intimate heterosexual relationships, it is speculated that he may have had a short relationship with Anna Karolina Orzelska, a countess five years his senior and the illegitimate daughter of King Augustus II the Strong of Poland and Saxony. The two first met in Dresden in February 1728 when Frederick was only sixteen and on a diplomatic visit with his father. Augustus allegedly attempted to divert Frederick's attentions away from his illegitimate daughter by offering him the nude opera singer called La Formera on a couch. When the naked singer appeared after dinner, Frederick ignored her embarrassedly while his religious and prudish father threw a handkerchief over his son's head. The Prussian king rejected the flirtatious atmosphere at the Saxon court and would never have tolerated his son having a relationship with Augustus' bastard daughter. The two allegedly began a secret love affair, with Frederick dedicating several poems and music compositions to her. Some have claimed that Orzelska was Frederick's first and only mistress - conjectures based largely on the wishful thinking of his sister Wilhelmine who disliked her brother's same-sex liaisons with young pages. It was probably a teenager's crush on a very unconventional young woman who was known for her tendency to drink, smoke tobacco, and have numerous affairs. Orzelska was also known for frequently dressing in men's clothing and military uniforms, for partaking in men's activities and for having an interest in dancing, which may have attracted young Frederick's attention. It has also been suggested that Orzelska was attempting to gather intelligence on Frederick and Prussia. However, when King Augustus and the countess, who was now married and pregnant, paid a return visit to the Prussian court in 1731, Frederick was frustrated and turned to unspecified other forms of dissipation. The alleged relationship between the crown prince and Orzelska was cited by some 19th century German historians as evidence against claims of Frederick's homosexuality.

== Contemporary opinion ==
"His father Frederick William called the heir to the throne a 'sodomite' and 'effeminate'", says biographer Wolfgang Burgdorf, who also summarizes all same-sex romances of Frederick. Even during his lifetime, much of European society assumed Frederick was homosexual. According to Johann Georg Ritter von Zimmermann, the private physician of George III and later of Frederick himself, also a member of his academy, "Frederick lost a great deal of 'sensual pleasure,' says Mr. Bushing (i.e. Anton Friedrich Büsching), a Prussian ecclesiastic counsellor, 'by his aversion to women; but he indemnified himself by his intercourse with men, recollecting from the history of philosophy, that Socrates was reported to have been very fond of Alcibiades.' Not only Mr. Bushing, however, but also Voltaire, La Beaumelle, the Duke de Choiseul, innumerable Frenchmen and Germans, almost all the friends and enemies of Frederick, almost all the princes and great men of Europe, even his servants, – even the confidants and friends of his latter years, were of opinion that he had loved, as it is pretended, Socrates loved Alcibiades."

In his undated poem, “Parallèle between Caesar and Frederick,” Denis Diderot wrote: “When I compare them [i.e. Caesar and Frederick] I see but one point in common, namely that they were both buggers. ... His Prussian Majesty never touched a woman, not even his own wife.” Dealing with the "love" of the king, the Austrian writer Joseph Richter felt that Frederick had "lost all feeling for the fair sex" and "believed he could fill the empty moments no better than with Socratic love. Instead of suppressing his lust for a lecherous life, he just gave it another direction. What a woman could have done, a page now did." In his Story of My Life, Giacomo Casanova noted that each member of First Potsdam Battalion "had a gold watch in the fob of his breeches. It was thus that the king rewarded the courage with which they had subjugated him, as Caesar once subjugated Nicomedes in Bithynia. No secret was made of it." When Frederick was in Potsdam, he spent much of his time at Sanssouci with a circle that was exclusively male, and during Frederick's lifetime the phrase les Potsdamistes was used throughout Europe to describe homosexual courtiers.

When towards the end of the Seven Years' War Frederick published a malicious satire against the mistress of Louis XV, Madame de Pompadour, and against the French nation in general, the French minister Étienne de Choiseul wrote a reply which ended with the following verse: « Peux-tu condamner la tendresse, / Toi qui n'en as connu l'ivresse / Que dans les bras de tes tambours. » (Can you damn the tenderness [of the French king] / You who only knew love drunkenness / In the arms of your drummers.)

William Hogarth's painting The Toilette may include a satirical depiction of Frederick as a flautist next to a mythological painting in which Zeus, in the form of an eagle, is abducting his male lover Ganymede – thereby publicly outing the Prussian king as a homosexual as early as 1744. Of course, word of his sometimes contemptuous treatment of his wife Elisabeth Christine had also got around at the European courts. In 1763, when Frederick, after the Seven Years' War, saw his wife for the first time in six years, he only told her: "Madame has become more stout" and then turned to his waiting sisters. He himself never received his wife in Sanssouci; she had no access to his court there. Instead, she fulfilled royal representative duties in the Berlin Palace that the monarch avoided, such as receiving new envoys or distantly related foreign princes. However, she only took on the de facto role of first lady of the state after her mother-in-law's death in 1757.

Anonymous Letters on the Gallantries of Berlin, Collected During a Journey by an Austrian Officer (1782), attributed to Johann Friedel, offer a deliberately scandalous glimpse into the social, cultural, and sexual life of Berlin toward the end of Frederick’s reign. Some of these letters are devoted to heterosexual prostitution and adultery. However, the well-known rumors regarding the sexual orientation of the King and his brother Henry appear to be responsible for the emergence of the homosexual culture in Berlin particularly described in the fifteenth to eighteenth letters. In them, the city is depicted as a hotbed of the unnatural vice of "Sodomie", with accounts describing the practice of masturbation ("Onanie"), trysts between the "warm" (a contemporary term for gay men), evening gatherings of homosexual men, and even a brothel with underage boys ("Knabentabagie"). Given that Frederick maintained no relations with his wife and otherwise shunned women, surrounding himself almost exclusively with men at Sanssouci Palace, this may explain the Austrian's denunciatory report about the prevalence of such a despicable lifestyle within Berlin society during his reign, particularly from a military perspective.

To muddy Frederick's homosexual reputation, Frederick's physician von Zimmermann claimed that Frederick had convinced himself that he was impotent due to a minor deformity he had received during an operation to cure gonorrhea in 1733. According to Zimmermann, Frederick pretended to be homosexual in order to appear as still virile and capable of intercourse, albeit with men. This story is doubted by biographer Wolfgang Burgdorf, who is of the opinion that "Frederick had a physical disgust of women" and therefore "was unable to sleep with them". The surgeon Gottlieb Engel, who prepared Frederick's body for burial, indignantly contested Zimmerman's story, saying the king's genitalia were "complete and perfect as those of any healthy man". In similar terms, the doctors who were involved in washing Frederick's corpse on 17 August 1786 reported that the recently deceased king showed no abnormalities whatsoever in the genitals. Ollenroth, Rosenmeyer and Liebert, the three surgeons of the 1st Life Guards Battalion, wrote that "the blessed king's external birth parts were healthy and not mutilated". "The two testicles were in their natural position without the slightest defect; the spermatic cord could be clearly felt up to the entrance of the abdominal ring without the least hardening or distention; the male member was of natural size; there was not the slightest bit in the soft parts of the pubic region characteristic of a scar or induration, or of any disease ever involving these parts."

== Legacy and historiography ==
Reinhard Alings, a curator of the Foundation for the Humboldt Forum in the Berlin Palace, writes on the SPSG website: “The topic probably really outraged few of his contemporaries, although it was always good for one or two sharp remarks. The moralizing question of whether Frederick the Great was gay results from later times, first from the Frederick-Prussian historiography of the 19th century up to our days. Above all, the doubt as to whether this could even be true arises from later historiography. It can be assumed that it was only the vehement contradiction of the 19th and 20th centuries that gave lasting impetus to the question of Frederick's (homo-)sexuality. Til today. With the end of the Hohenzollern Monarchy in Germany and more critical historiography, there were fewer reasons to make the topic taboo.”

Frederick's homosexuality was rejected by professional historians for centuries after his death. In 1921, doctor and amateur historian Gaston Vorberg wrote an essay to debunk ongoing rumors around Frederick's sexuality, asserting that he was heterosexual ("Gossip about Frederick II's sexual life"). For example, Voltaire's malices could be dismissed as obviously driven by vengeful motives without having to wonder if there might be any truth to them. Historian Johannes Kunisch (1937–2015) still insisted that there is "no serious evidence" of Frederick's homosexuality and that contemporary statements about this "facet" of Frederick's nature were "denunciatory". In his youth, for example, the crown prince would have had affairs with peasant 'nymphs', and as a young king he dated the ballet dancer Barbara Campanini. Finally, Kunisch wrote, it was also possible that Frederick only staged his homosexuality, for example to hide impotence. This opinion has been described by others as "hair-raising psychologising, even pathologising ahistoricity". It has also been argued that the king's interest in women such as the ballet dancer Barbara Campanini and Anna Karolina Orzelska can be explained by the phenomenon of the often female “gay icons” that is, according to the academic studies of Professor Georges-Claude Guilbert, widespread among male homosexuals. According to Frank-Lothar Kroll, Frederick's homosexuality was significantly less life-determining than that of his brother Henry. The latter proved very successful as a general; his luck in battle was less changeable than that of the king himself which Frederick expressly acknowledged. In his later written admonitions to his nephew and successor, Frederick mockingly called the officers in Henry's regiments "a collection of pederasts".

To others it seems that deliberate ignoring of abounding circumstantial evidence is rooted in conviction that a gay ruler would be a disgrace, as if Frederick's homosexuality would shrink his historic size.

In contrast, his homosexuality was embraced by the homosexual publications of Weimar Germany, which featured him on their covers and praised him. Thomas Mann had provided an early precursor to this point of view with his essay Friedrich und die große Koalition ("Frederick and the Grand Coalition"), written in late 1914, at the start of World War I. He prominently highlighted the "feminine" and artistic facets of Frederick, viewing the monarch as a deeply conflicted personality, torn between martial toughness and an intellectual sensitivity—manifested, for instance, in his love of French literature and his flute playing. Vorberg's conclusions were sharply criticized by another amateur historian, Ferdinand Karsch, in the gay publication Die Freundschaft. In 1931, homosexual activist Richard Linsert published the book Intrigue and Love: On Politics and Sexual Life which spent nine pages discussing Frederick and his sexuality. In 1937, the literary writer Jochen Klepper, who was persecuted by the Nazis and ultimately perished, published his successful novel The Father. Novel of the Soldier King, in which he got to the bottom of the traumatic father-son relationship, although only hinting at a homosexual disposition in the son. He concluded that the father's values of discipline, order, and determination eventually prevailed over the son's effeminate tendencies. This was again compatible with the general historiography that Frederick, endowed with these paternal values, successfully used the powerful army his father had built up to transform a backward agricultural state on the periphery into a major European power.

Modern research is not typically concerned with proving Frederick II's homosexuality, as it became the accepted consensus among most historians. It frequently takes greater interest in the consequences of his disposition, and how they affected his reign as King of Prussia. Historian Wolfgang Burgdorf suggests that Frederick's abuse and constant public humiliation by his father, Frederick William, for being too soft and effeminate stemmed from the latter's hatred for everything effeminate and his disappointment at the son's inability to father a successor. Burgdorf further suggests that Frederick William forcing his son to watch his lover's execution by sword, his subsequent intention − which was prevented only by the Emperor and the Prussian nobility − to also execute his son for attempted desertion, his subsequent suggestion that his son should commit suicide, and − after abandoning these bloody plans − the strict military and administrative training that he finally prescribed for his son, could explain Frederick II's "militaristic decisions" as King "as if the warlike royal hero wanted to prove to his dead father that he was a tough man." Likewise, his lack of empathy could be explained by his own cruel experiences as a youth, because the conquest of Silesia cost the lives of tens of thousands of his soldiers and his country's citizens, which never affected Frederick in the least. Recent source research and historiography shows that the king absolutely wanted to go down in history as "the great" and reveal a person with great talents – and equally great weaknesses.

== Sources ==
- Asprey, Robert B. (1986). Frederick the Great: The Magnificent Enigma. New York: Ticknor & Fields. ISBN 978-0-89919-352-6.
- Blanning, T. C. W. (2016). Frederick the Great: King of Prussia. Random House. ISBN 978-1-4000-6812-8.
- Clark, Christopher (2006). Iron Kingdom: The Rise and Downfall of Prussia 1600–1947. Cambridge, MA: Belknap Press of Harvard University Press. ISBN 978-0-674-02385-7.
- Crompton (2009). Homosexuality and Civilization. Harvard University Press. ISBN 978-0-674-03006-0.
- Fraser, David (2000). Frederick the Great: King of Prussia. New York: Fromm International. ISBN 978-0-88064-261-3.
- MacDonogh, Giles (2000). Frederick the Great: A Life in Deed and Letters. Macmillan. ISBN 978-0-312-25318-9.
- Mitford, Nancy (1984) [1970]. Frederick the Great. New York: E. P. Dutton. ISBN 0-525-48147-8.
