= Peter Karl Christoph von Keith =

Prussian confidant of Frederick the Great (1711–1756)

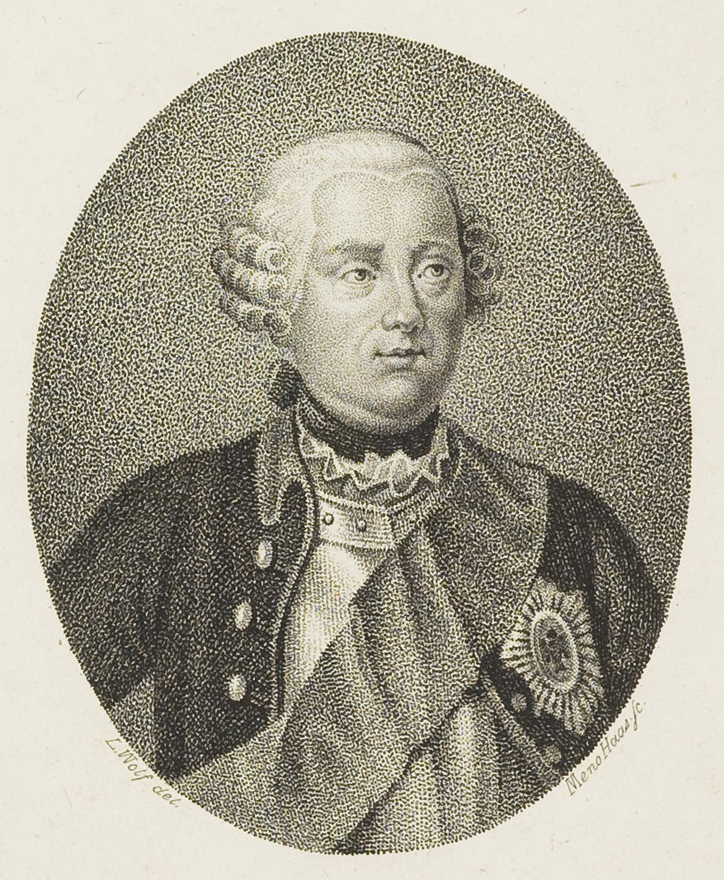
Peter Karl Christoph von Keith, engraving by Meno Haas

Peter Karl Christoph von Keith (24 May 1711 – 27 December 1756) was a Prussian statesman, military officer, and confidant of Crown Prince Frederick II, later known as Frederick the Great. Keith was of a branch of the Scottish Clan Keith, which granted him noble status, and was descendant from Scottish emigrants residing in Pomerania. Keith was initially introduced to the Prussian aristocracy by becoming a page to Frederick William I.

== Life ==
Although born in Farther Pomerania, Keith was ethnically Scottish as his family had come to Pomerania via Sweden. Keith was introduced to Crown Prince Frederick during his time as a page to Frederick William, and by age 17 quickly became close with him due to a mutual fear of the king who cultivated an ideal of ultramasculinity in his court, and derided his son's supposedly "effeminate tendencies" such as making music with the transverse flute. There is speculation that Frederick had interest in a homosexual relationship with Keith, however the matter would never be settled with absolute certainty (see: Sexuality of Frederick the Great). He frequently provided the Crown Prince with information regarding his standing with Frederick William.

Frederick's sister Wilhelmine wrote in her memoirs about the isolation of her brother, who received military training and was strictly forbidden from engaging in music, reading, science or the arts:

But this desolation in which he lived led him to indulge in debauchery. Because the court masters did not dare to follow him, he completely fell for them. One of the king's pages, named Keith, was the organizer of his banquets. This young man was so good at ingratiating himself with him that he loved him with all his heart and gave him all his trust. I didn't know his dissolute life, but I had noticed his familiarity with this page and had repeatedly reproached him, reminding him that this behavior was unbecoming of his rank. But he always found excuses and explained to me that the boy was his spy and that he had reason to be considerate of him because the warnings he received often saved him a lot of trouble.

Although Keith was initially within good standing of Frederick William I, he rapidly fell out of favour once rumour was spread that he had an intimate relationship with the Crown Prince, after which he was promoted to an officer in the army, and was appointed to a regiment close to Cleves in order to separate him from the crown prince. A younger brother of Keith took over the page position.

Despite the transfer, Keith continued to maintain contact with Frederick from Wesel in the Prussian province Duchy of Cleves. In 1730 the crown prince wanted to give him a role as an assistant in his planned escape from Prussia. The crown prince's plan was to flee to France, meet up with Keith there and flee together to England. After the failed escape, Frederick warned him with a note that said: “Sauvez Vous – Tout est decouvert” (Get yourself to safety – everything is revealed). Keith then fled to The Hague. He escaped from his pursuers with the help of the British ambassador Philip Stanhope, 4th Earl of Chesterfield. During a storm he was able to cross from Scheveningen to England in a fishing boat on August 18, 1730. From there, at the suggestion of King George II, who wanted to prevent an expected extradition request from his unloved brother-in-law Frederick William, he went with Admiral Norris to Portugal, where he became a major in the cavalry. He later lived in London. As he no longer could be punished, Frederick William I hanged Keith's effigy symbolically for his involvement in Frederick's escape plans and as a deserter. Hans Hermann von Katte, who had succeeded Keith as an intimate friend and confidant of the crown prince, was beheaded on November 6, 1730 in the Küstrin Fortress in front of Frederick for his help in the escape attempt.

After Frederick's accession to the throne, Keith returned to Prussia in 1740 and married Adriane von Knyphausen, the daughter of the former minister Friedrich Ernst, Baron von Innhausen and Knyphausen. But he couldn't find his way back to his old position of favorite or just confidant of Frederick. The king appointed him stable master and lieutenant colonel, as well as an honorary member of the Academy of Sciences in 1744 and curator of it in 1747, but kept him at distance. Keith found himself not sufficiently rewarded by this and an annual salary of 1,200 thalers. Frederick rejected a later suggestion from the English court to send Keith as an envoy to London, arguing that he was too inexperienced diplomatically.

He died on 27 December 1756.

== Bibliography ==
- Baireuth, W. (1888). Memoirs of Wilhelmine, Margravine of Baireuth. New York: Harper & Brothers. OCLC 352010.
