= Hans Hermann von Katte =

Possible lover of Frederick the Great (1704–1730)

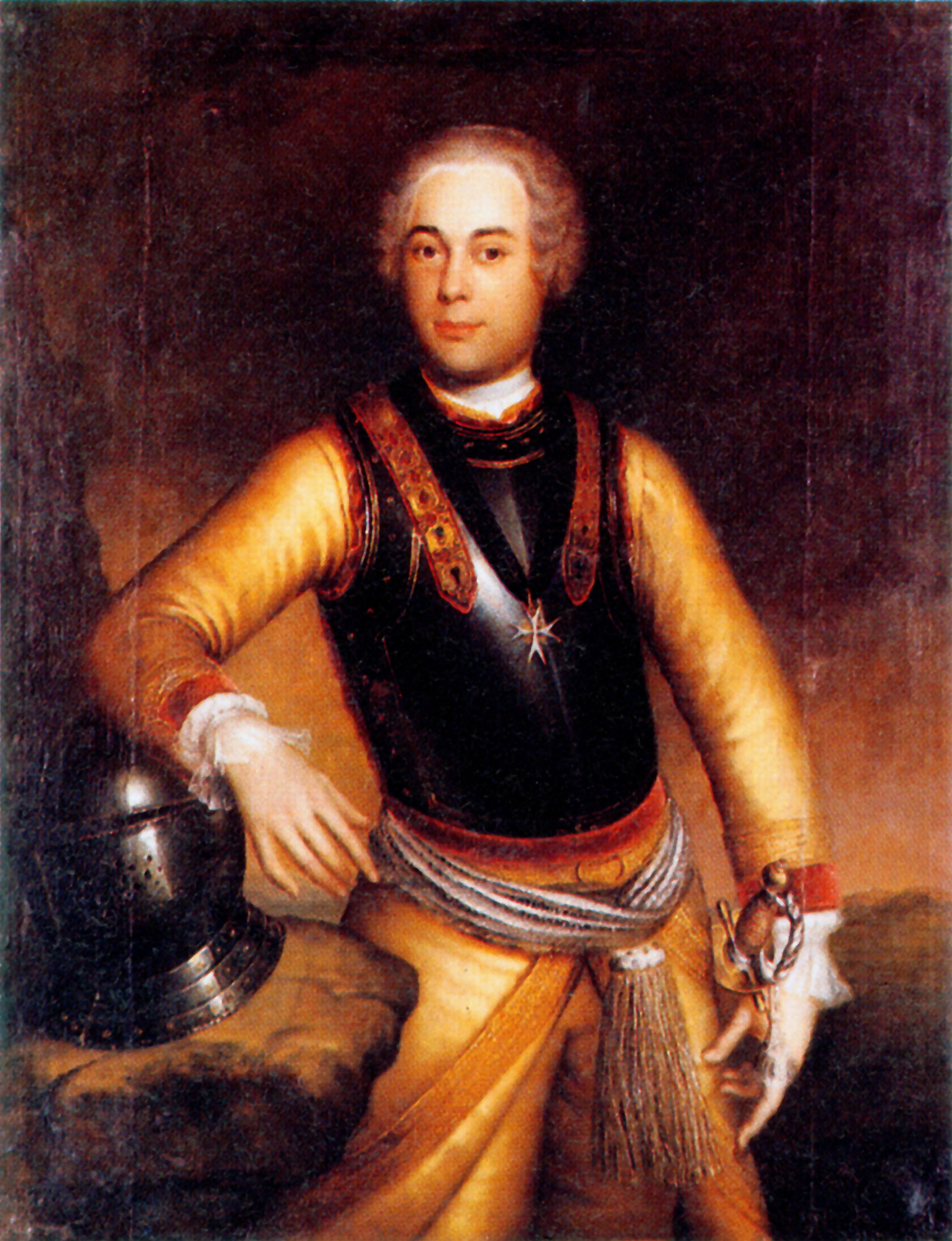
- Born: 28 February 1704; Berlin, Kingdom of Prussia, Holy Roman Empire
- Died: 6 November 1730 (aged 26); Küstrin, Kingdom of Prussia (now Kostrzyn nad Odrą, Poland), Holy Roman Empire
- Cause of death: Execution by Frederick William I of Prussia
- Parent(s): Hans Heinrich Graf von Katte; Dorothee Sophia von Wartensleben

Hans Hermann von Katte (28 February 1704 – 6 November 1730) was a Lieutenant of the Prussian Army, and a friend, tutor and possible lover of the future King Frederick II of Prussia, who was at the time the Crown Prince. Katte was executed by Frederick's father, the Prussian King Frederick William I, when Frederick plotted to escape from Prussia to Britain. It was possible that Frederick II intended to defect to the service of the British King George II (his maternal uncle) and possibly return to Prussia to depose his father.

== Life ==
Born in the Prussian capital of Berlin, Katte was a nobleman by birth, coming from a long line of aristocratic military men. His ancestors were squires of Wust in the Altmark. His father, field marshal general Graf Hans Heinrich von Katte, was one of Frederick William I's most regarded cuirassiers. Katte's mother, Dorothee Sophia von Wartensleben, was the daughter of a seasoned and revered field marshal, Graf Alexander Hermann von Wartensleben. Hans Hermann studied in Königsberg and Utrecht, focusing on French and law. After completing his studies he joined the Prussian Army, as temporary military service was a prerequisite for his desired judicial career.

It is not known when Frederick II and Katte met for the first time. However, when they both attended private mathematics and mechanics lessons in 1729, they became acquainted rapidly. Frederick, eight years younger than Katte, admired Katte for his cosmopolitan attitude. Both of them were interested in poetry and playing the flute. An intimate friendship developed between them and due to the long-standing perception (even during his own lifetime) of Frederick as homosexual, has led some historians to speculate that their relationship may have been romantic and/or sexual (see: Sexuality of Frederick the Great). A contemporary courtier, Karl Ludwig von Pöllnitz, reports that the two treated each other “like a lover with his mistress.” As a close friend and confidant of the Crown Prince, Katte succeeded the page Peter Karl Christoph von Keith, whom the king had recently transferred to Infantry Regiment No. 31 in Wesel as a lieutenant because he disapproved of his influence on his son.

Frederick's sister Wilhelmine wrote in her memoirs about Katte:

He was intelligent, well-read, worldly. The good company he continued to frequent had allowed him to adopt polished manners that were quite rare in Berlin at the time. His face was more unpleasant than engaging: two black eyebrows almost covered his eyes; There was something ominous about his look that foreshadowed his fate. His tanned, pockmarked skin enhanced his ugliness. He played the role of a free spirit and took his life to excess; Great ambition and arrogance went hand in hand with this vice. Such a favorite was far from dissuading my brother from his aberrations.

One day in June 1730, the King came home earlier than expected. For one hour, Von Katte and visiting composer Johann Joachim Quantz hid in a small room behind the fireplace. His father discovered his secret collection of books and clothes, which he threw in the fire. His books had to be sold or auctioned. Not long after, Frederick revealed to Katte that he had a plan to flee to Great Britain as a way to leave his harsh and despotic father. At first Katte tried to hold Frederick back, but at the end supported Frederick's plan to escape. A first attempt to escape from the Zeithain Encampment in June 1730, where they accompanied the king, failed because Frederick and Katte could not get horses. On 5 August 1730, while the royal retinue was near Mannheim in the Electorate of the Palatinate, Frederick tried again to escape from his quarters. At that point Katte stayed in Potsdam, but his younger brother was there as a page. This time post horses had been arranged, but the crown prince's valet woke up and called the guard. A compromising letter unmasked Katte as an accomplice; Frederick and Katte were subsequently arrested and imprisoned in Küstrin. Because they were army officers who had tried to flee Prussia for England, Frederick William I leveled an accusation of treason against the pair.

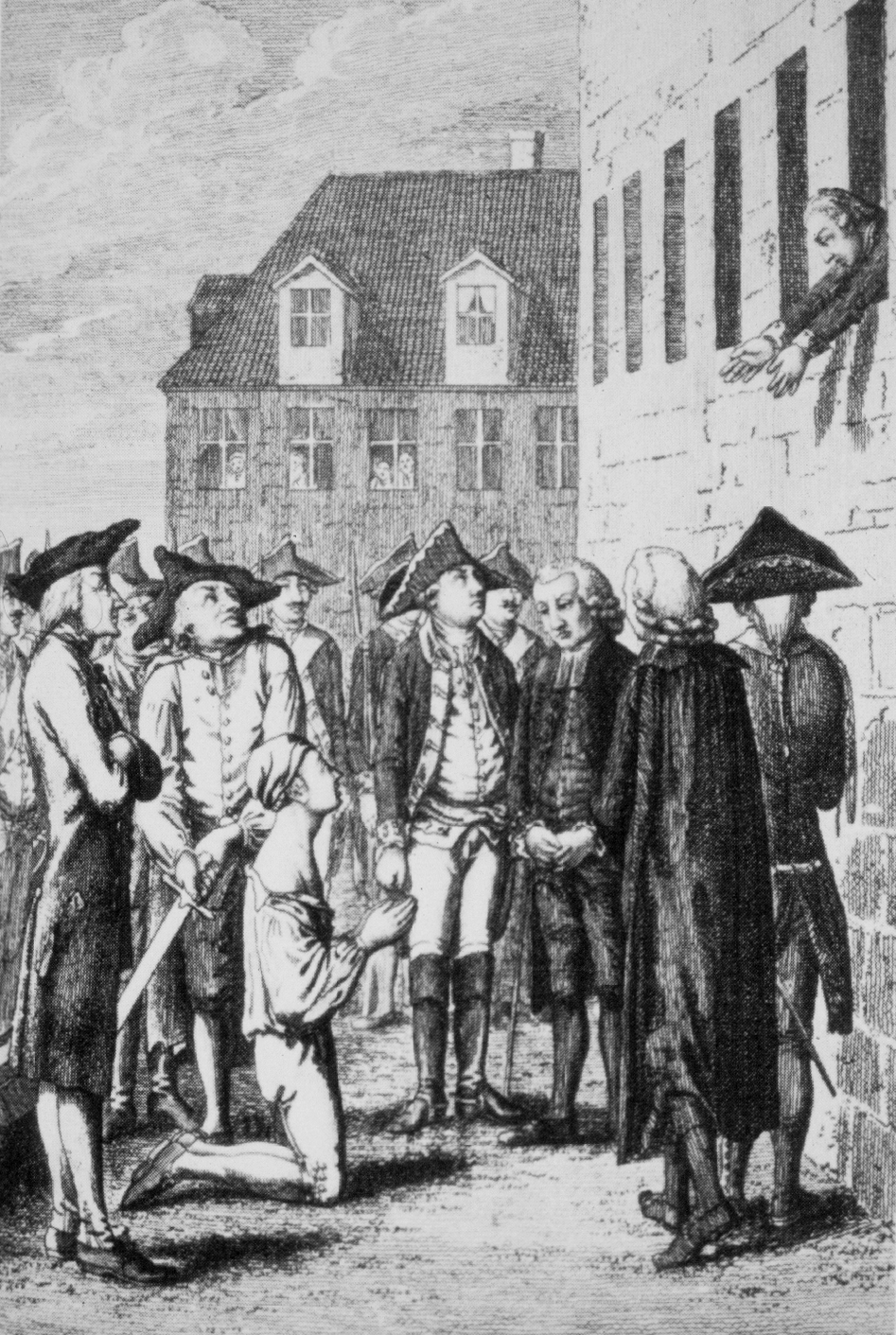
Katte's decapitation

A court martial found Katte guilty of desertion and sentenced him to life imprisonment, which would last until the King himself died, but Frederick Wilhelm ordered the sentence changed to beheading, declaring that "it would be better that Katte came to death than the justice out of the world." As Katte was an officer of the King's Guard, Frederick William argued that if Katte were let off lightly, the King's Guard could never be trusted again. All petitions of mercy for Katte, including one from Frederick and one from Count Seckendorff, the ambassador of Emperor Charles VI, were ignored. The king wrote to the delinquent's father, his esteemed general Katte: "Your son is a scoundrel; mine too. What can fathers do about it?"

Katte was beheaded at the fortress of Küstrin, where the king forced Frederick to watch the execution. However, when he was brought up to be executed, Frederick shouted in French to Katte, "Veuillez pardonner, mon cher Katte, au nom de Dieu, pardonne-moi!" ("Please forgive me dear Katte, in God's name, forgive me.") Katte called back in the same language, "There is nothing to forgive, I die for you with joy in my heart!" Frederick then fell to the floor in a dead faint. Katte's body was left overnight on the execution scaffold that reached up to Frederick's window by order of the king. Yet Katte's last words were not his last farewell. Soon it was discovered that Katte had written a farewell letter to his father before his execution which stated:

Into tears, my father, that's how I want to melt away, when thinking that this letter will cause the greatest grief to a faithful father's heart. That all the hopes for my future welfare and its comfort in old age has to disappear at once; that all applied effort and diligence for my upbringing to the maturity of the desired happiness even have been in vain; yes – that I will have to bow in the prime of my years without presenting to you in this world the fruits of my efforts and my achieved sciences. How didn't I think to ascend the world and make your conceived hope one satisfied; how didn't I think that I will not lack of happiness and well-being; how wasn't I occupied from the certainty of my reputation. But all in vain! How futile man's thoughts are: At once everything is falling apart; and how sadly is the scenery of my life coming to an end; and how is my current state distinguished from that with which my thoughts have gone; I must – instead of promenading the way of honor and reputation – walk the path of disgrace and a shameful death. ... Get strong again my father, and believe me, God is with me in this game, without whose will nothing happens, not even a sparrow on the earth may fall! ... Meanwhile, I thank you with filial respect for all the father loyalty shown to me, from my childhood to the present hour ... Now nothing is left for me but to close with this consolation: Even though, my father, you haven't experienced anything high and distinguished from me in this world, oh! so please be assured that you will find even higher in heaven. Your faithful until death son. Hans Hermann

Upon witnessing his death, Frederick was plunged into deep despair for three days. After that, he never spoke of Katte again nor ever visited his grave. Katte's body was initially buried in the fortress moat on the king's instructions. However, at the family's request, it was exhumed and transferred to the family crypt in Wust. His grandfather was given the executioner's bill to pay and the executioner's sword. However, four weeks after his accession to the throne in 1740, Frederick appointed Katte's father field marshal and raised him to the hereditary rank of count. But since his younger sons died without descendants, the title expired only eight years later.

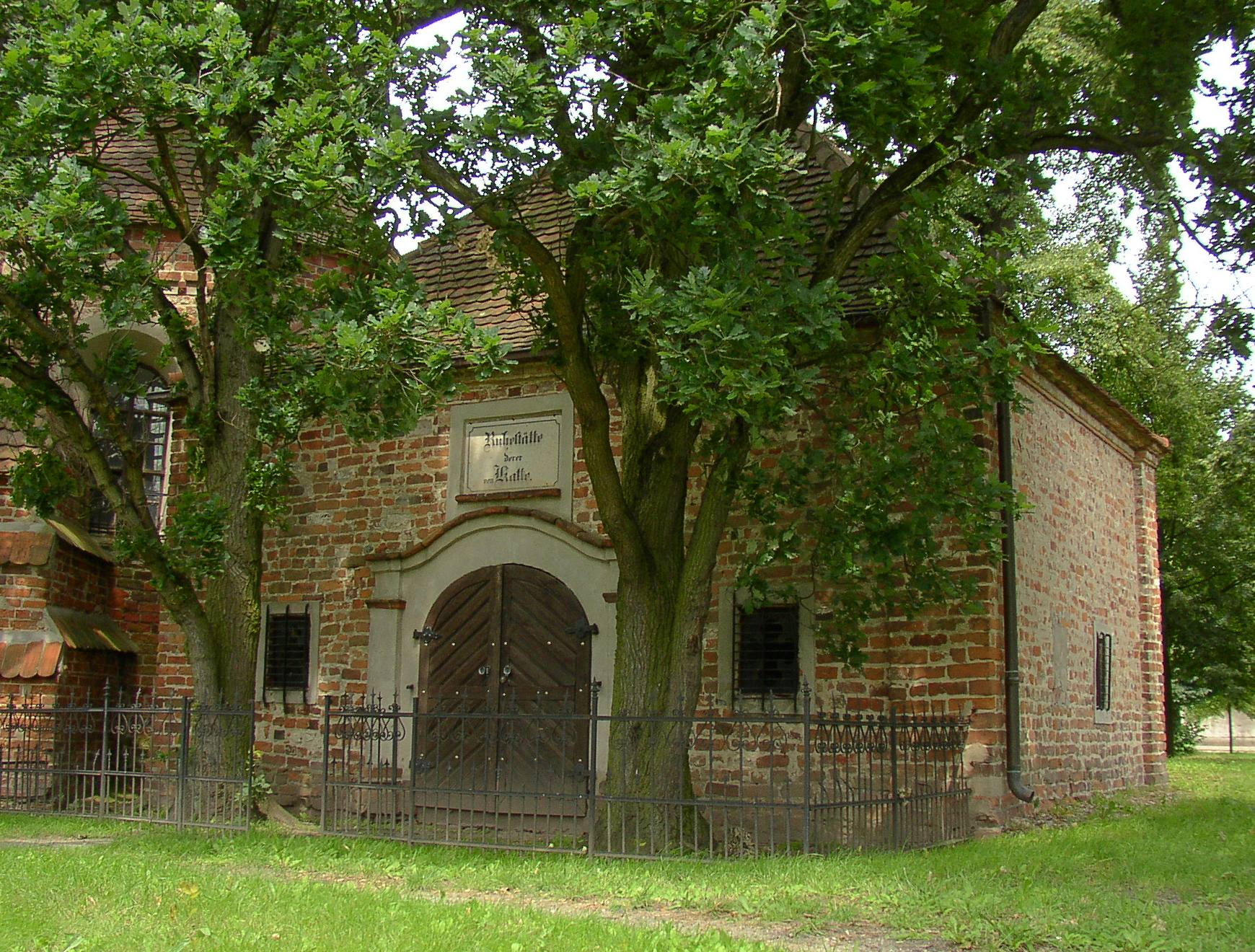
Mausoleum of the Katte family in Wust, Sachsen-Anhalt
