= Marthe de Roucoulle =

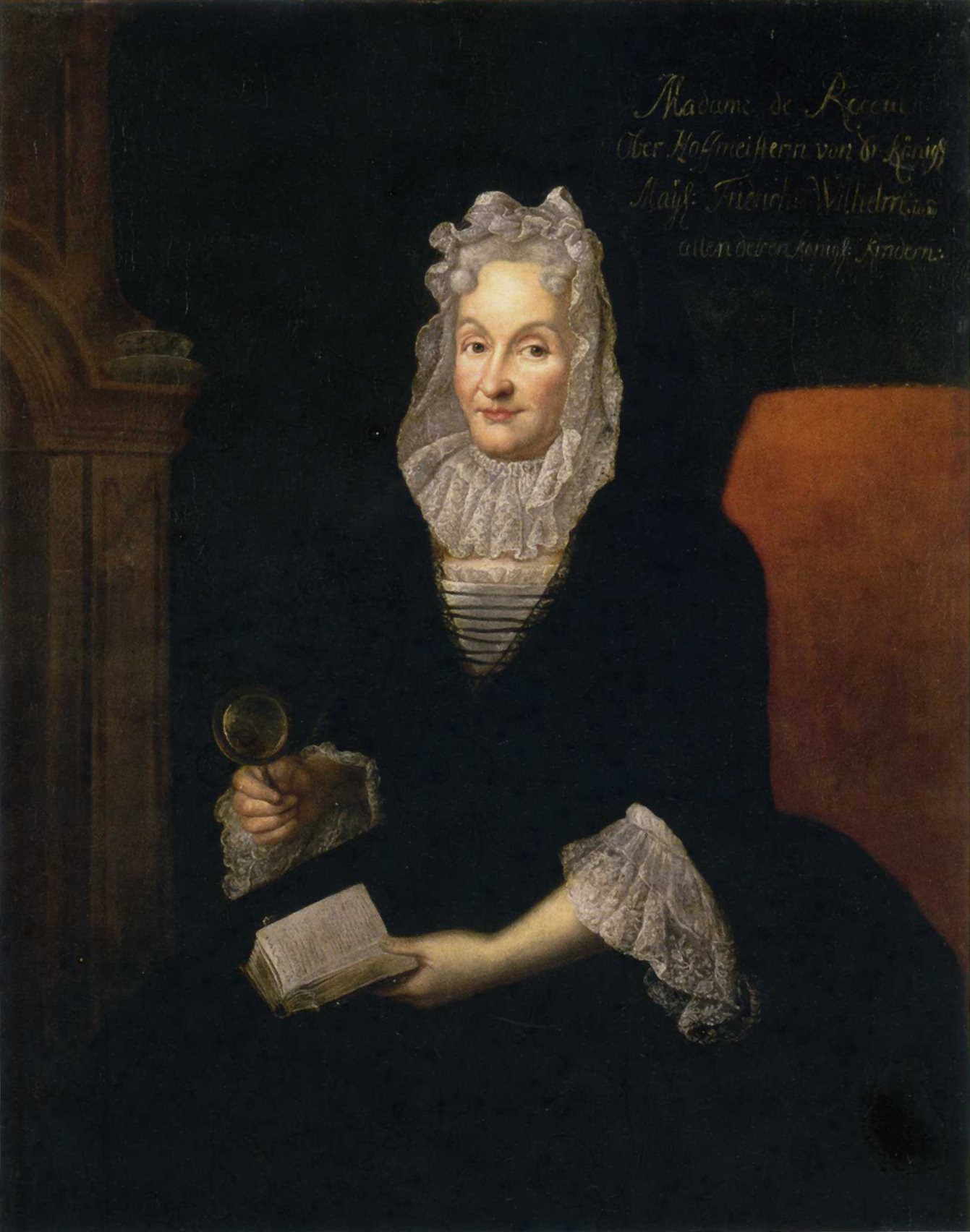
Madame Marthe de Rocoulle

Marthe de Roucoulle or de Rocoulle (1659–1741) was a French Huguenot educator and salonnaire active in Prussia. She was the governess first of Frederick William I of Prussia and later of his son Frederick the Great.

== Life ==
Marthe de Roucoulle was originally from Normandy in France, reportedly "of gentle blood, never very rich". She was Protestant and belonged to those French Huguenots who chose to flee France for Prussia after the revocation of the Edict of Nantes. She arrived in Prussia as a penniless widow under the name Marthe de Montbail with her mother-in-law and her daughter and namesake. She was received at the Prussian court by the future Queen Sophie Charlotte, who liked her company and found her suitable as governess for her son because of her intelligence and good manners.

=== Governess to Frederick William I ===
She was appointed governess to the future Frederick William I after his return from Hanover in 1692. As she never learned to speak proper German, the German of the monarch was affected by French words. She eventually married another French Huguenot, Roucoulle, who served as an officer in the Prussian army, which was quite common for male Huguenots in Prussia.

=== Governess to Frederick the Great ===
In 1712, the widowed Roucoulle was appointed governess to the future Frederick the Great by her former charge, king Frederick William I, and remained in this position for the first seven years of his life. His head governess was Frau von Kamecke "Kamken", but her position was but formal and the actual work was done by her sous gouvernante, Marthe de Roucoulle, in turn superior to the nurses and sub-governesses, many of whom too were French Huguenots. Frederick called her "Chère Maman", and had a noted good relationship with her. In 1714, she was also appointed governess in charge of the royal princesses.

Marthe de Roucoulle retired as the governess of the crown prince after he reached the age of seven, but continued as governess to the royal princesses, among them his sister, Louisa Ulrika of Prussia, future queen of Sweden: her daughter Marthe de Montbail was made hofmeisterin in 1734. She also enjoyed society, and hosted a weekly soirée in which the Prussian nobility mingled with the French Huguenot community in exile.

=== Later life ===
She kept in contact with her former charge Frederick the Great, and had a good relationship with him also after he became an adult. He made a point of treating her with respect and gratitude, made her several favors and always visited her salon, the Roucoulles Soirée, once a week whenever he was in Berlin, during which it was noted how well he behaved. He also provided her daughter with a pension.

Marthe de Roucoulle is described in the memoirs of Princess Wilhelmina.
