= Die Nacht ist vorgedrungen =

German hymn

"Die Nacht ist vorgedrungen" (The night has advanced) is a poem in German written by Jochen Klepper in 1937 that became an Advent hymn with a melody by Johannes Petzold, contained in several hymnals and songbooks.

== Inhalt ==
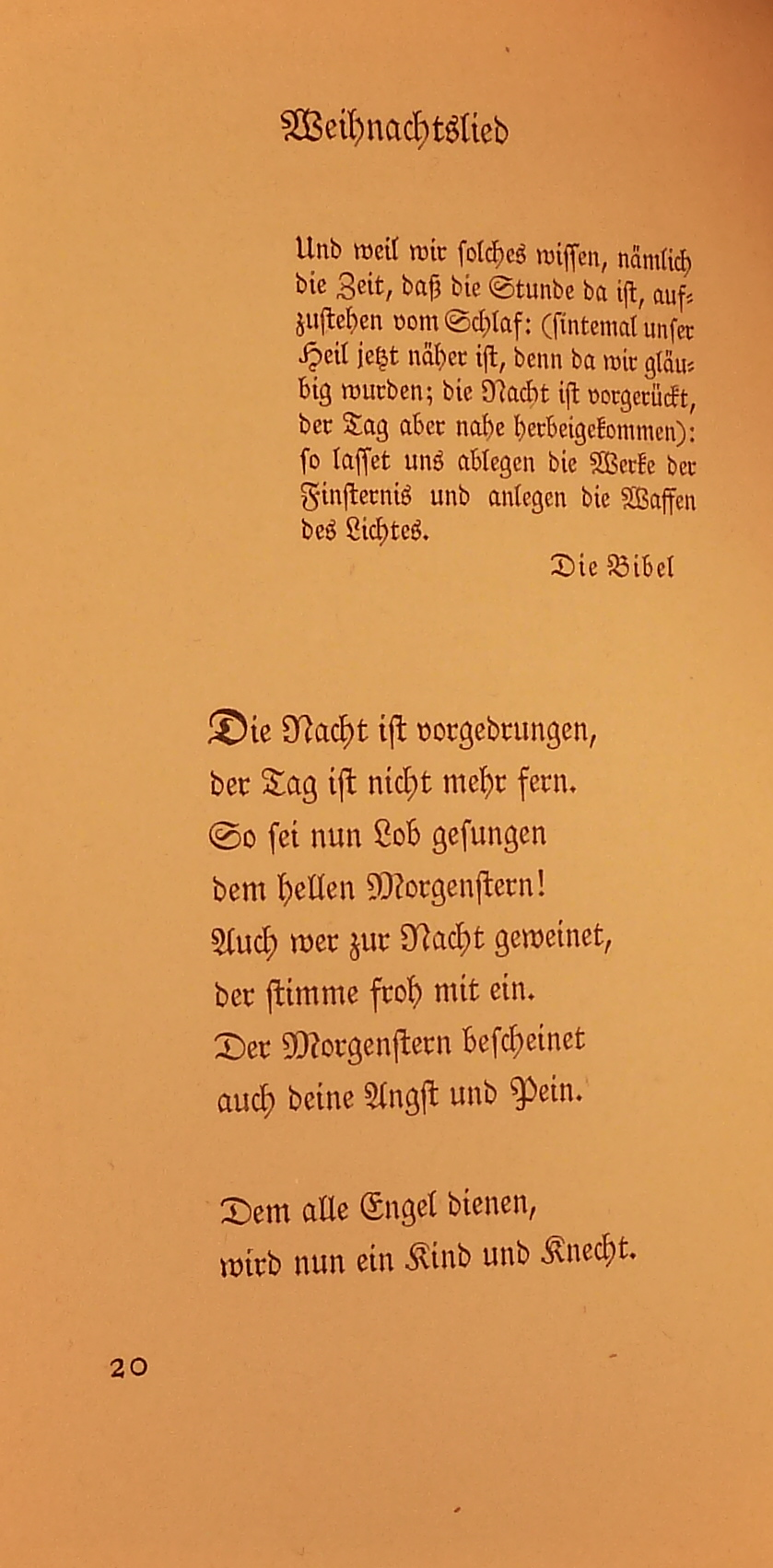
Beginning in the first publication, 1938

Jochen Klepper wrote the poem "Die Nacht ist vorgedrungen" on 18 December 1937; it was published in 1938 in the collection Kyrie. Geistliche Lieder, titled "Weihnachtslied" (Christmas carol). Klepper introduced it by a Bible verse:

Und das tut, weil ihr die Zeit erkennt, nämlich dass die Stunde da ist, aufzustehen vom Schlaf, denn unser Heil ist jetzt näher als zu der Zeit, da wir gläubig wurden. Die Nacht ist vorgerückt, der Tag aber nahe herbeigekommen. So lasst uns ablegen die Werke der Finsternis und anlegen die Waffen des Lichts. (Romans 13:11–12)

This verse is part of the epistle of the First Sunday of Advent.

== Melodies and hymnals ==
The song is part of the Protestant hymnal Evangelisches Gesangbuch (EG 16) and of the Catholic hymnal Gotteslob (GL 220); The song was translated into Czech by Miroslav Heryán in 1979, as "Noc ke konci se kloní" in the Protestant of the Bohemian brethren. Besides a melody by Johannes Petzold, the hymn can be sung to other melodies, such as "Valet will ich dir geben", "O Haupt voll Blut und Wunden" and "Wie soll ich dich empfangen." --
