= In the Shadow of Your Wings =

Diary by Jochen Klepper

- Author: Jochen Klepper
- Publication date: 1956
- ISBN: 978-3765535802

In the Shadow of Your Wings (Unter dem Schatten deiner Flügel) is a collection of selected entries from the diary of Jochen Klepper covering the period between April 1932 and 10 December 1942. The book appeared in 1956.

== Content ==
The German Protestant writer, journalist and poet of ecclesiastical songs, Jochen Klepper, loses his creative power over the course of the ten year diaries, under steadily increasing National Socialist reprisals. Klepper's wife Johanna ('Hanni') is Jewish, and has two daughters from her first marriage. Klepper's younger step-daughter Renate is threatened with deportation after the outbreak of World War II. Klepper applies for an exit permit for the young girl to go to Sweden, but his request is turned down by the security services. Klepper takes his own life together along the lives of his wife and child in an undistinguished Berlin residential house.

== Bibliography ==
- Jochen Klepper: Unter dem Schatten deiner Flügel. Aus den Tagebüchern der Jahre 1932 – 1942. Lizenzausgabe 1997 (From the diaries of the years 1932 – 1942. Licensing Issue in 1997) Brunnen Verlag Gießen. pp. 671, ISBN 3-7655-1815-8

Editions

- Jochen Klepper: Unter dem Schatten deiner Flügel. Aus den Tagebüchern der Jahre 1932 – 1942. Deutsche Verlags-Anstalt Stuttgart 1956

Secondary literature

- Frank-Lothar Kroll, N. Luise Hackelsberger, Sylvia Taschka (Editors): Werner Bergengruen: Schriftstellerexistenz in der Diktatur. Aufzeichnungen und Reflexionen zu Politik, Geschichte und Kultur 1949 bis 1963 (Writer existence in the dictatorship. Notes and reflections on politics, history and culture of 1949 to 1963). Vol. 22 of the series: Elke Fröhlich, Udo Wengst (Editors): Biographische Quellen zur Zeitgeschichte (Biographical sources on contemporary history). R. Oldenbourg Verlag Munich in 2005, pp. 298, ISBN 3-486-20023-2
- Deutsche Literaturgeschichte (German literary history). Vol. 10. Paul Riegel and Wolfgang van Rinsum: Drittes Reich und Exil 1933-1945 (Third Reich and exile 1933–1945). pp. 81 – 83. dtv Munich in February 2004. pp. 303, ISBN 3-423-03350-9
- Gero von Wilpert: Lexikon der Weltliteratur. Deutsche Autoren A – Z (Encyclopedia of World literature. German authors A – Z). p. 339. Stuttgart in 2004. pp. 698, ISBN 3-520-83704-8
