= Alfred Stier =

German composer

Alfred Stier (27 November 1880 – 21 July 1967) was a German composer and music director of the Evangelical-Lutheran Church of Saxony.

== Life ==
Stier was born in Greiz. After attending primary schools, he went to Leipzig in 1902 to study church music. In Limbach, he received his first position as a full-time church musician in 1904, and in 1911 he went to the Church of Reconciliation, Dresden. He was a Liedermeister and honorary Alter Herr of the "Musische Studentenverbindung" Erato Dresden".

From 1919 to 1945, he was editor of the Sächsische Zeitschrift für Kirchenmusiker, and from 1933 to 1944 he was co-editor of Musik und Kirche. In 1928 he was one of the Dresden co-founders of the Kunstdienst der evangelischen Kirche. In 1933, he was appointed regional church music director. In 1947, he went to Ilsenburg, where from 1948 he was the regional singing director of the Evangelical Church of the Church Province of Saxony. He led numerous singing weeks, courses for choir singing with lay people. He published old church music and composed chamber music, cantatas, choral works and Lieder himself. He was awarded an honorary doctorate from the University of Greifswald in 1955. He died in Ilsenburg in 1967 aged 86.

== Work ==
- Die Erneuerung der Kirchenmusik. Kassel 1926
- Leitfaden für kirchenmusikalische Arbeit. Berlin 1947
- Der Dienst des Kirchenmusikers. Eine praktische Handreichung für Kantoren und Organisten in Stadt und Land. (Im Dienst der Kirche 9). Kassel and Basel 1952.
- Kirchliches Singen. Gütersloh 1952
- Musika, eine Gnadengabe Gottes : vom Dienst der Musik am Menschen. Berlin 1960
