= Gott wohnt in einem Lichte =

"Gott wohnt in einem Lichte" is a German hymn with a text by Jochen Klepper, written in 1938. With a melody by Bartholomäus Gesius (1603), it became part of several hymnals and song books.

The song is full of biblical references. It is part of the Protestant hymnal Evangelisches Gesangbuch as EG 379 and the Catholic hymnal Gotteslob as GL 429, among others.

== Literature ==
- Jochen Klepper: Kyrie. Geistliche Lieder; Berlin-Steglitz: Eckart-Verlag, 1938
