= Frederick William I of Prussia =

King in Prussia from 1713 to 1740

Frederick William I
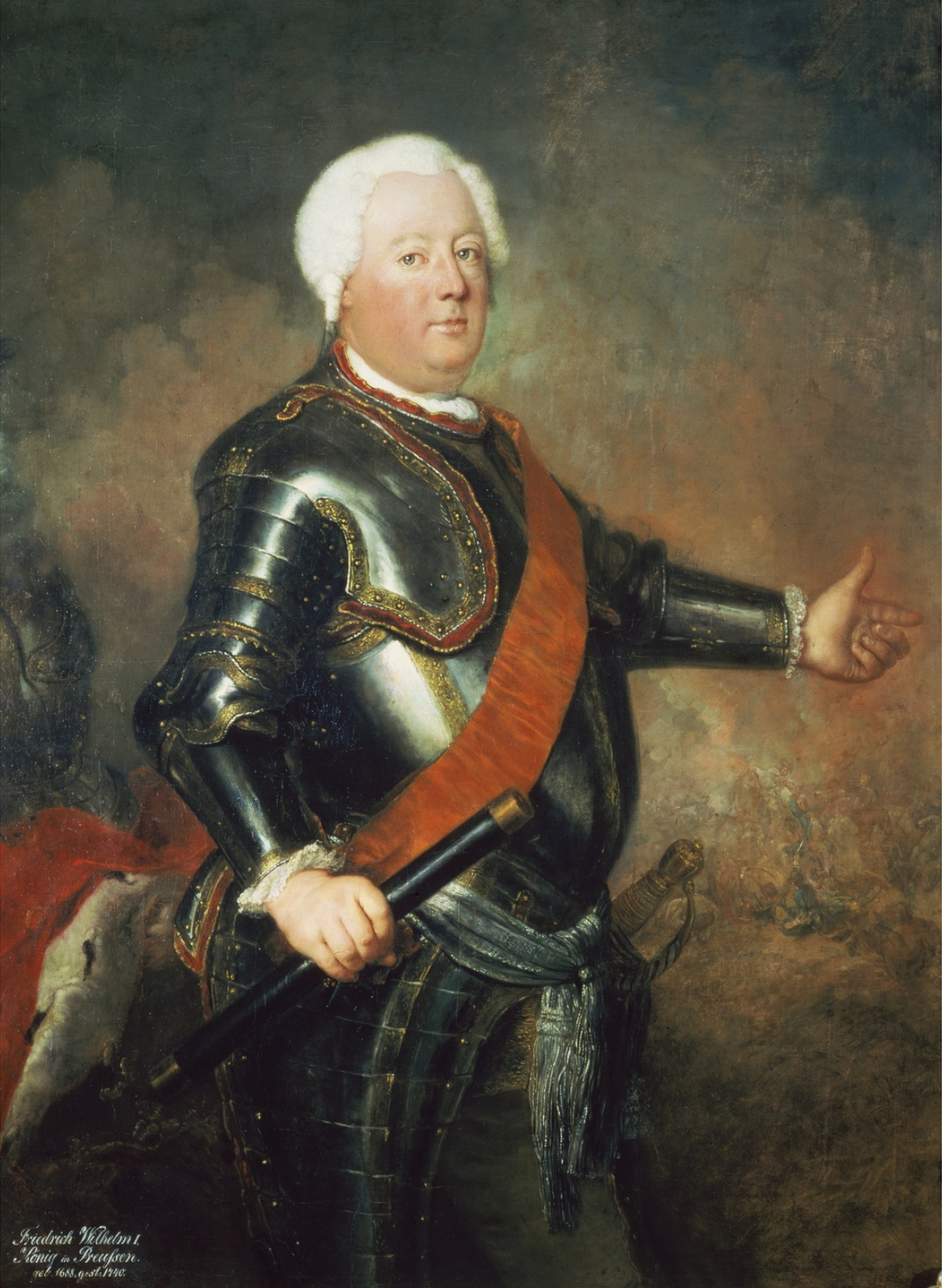
- Portrait by Antoine Pesne, c. 1733

King in Prussia Elector of Brandenburg
- Reign: 25 February 1713 – 31 May 1740
- Predecessor: Frederick I
- Successor: Frederick II
- Born: 14 August 1688; Berlin, Brandenburg–Prussia, Holy Roman Empire
- Died: 31 May 1740 (aged 51); City Palace, Potsdam, Kingdom of Prussia, Holy Roman Empire
- Burial: Church of Peace, Potsdam
- Spouse: Sophia Dorothea of Hanover (m. 1706)
- Issue more...: Prince Frederick Louis; Wilhelmine, Margravine of Brandenburg-Bayreuth; Prince Frederick William; Frederick II of Prussia; Princess Charlotte; Frederica Louise, Margravine of Brandenburg-Ansbach; Philippine Charlotte, Duchess of Brunswick-Wolfenbüttel; Prince Louis; Sophia Dorothea, Margravine of Brandenburg-Schwedt; Louisa Ulrika, Queen of Sweden; Prince Augustus William; Anna Amalia, Abbess of Quedlinburg; Prince Henry; Prince Augustus Ferdinand
- House: Hohenzollern
- Father: Frederick I
- Mother: Sophia Charlotte of Hanover
- Religion: Calvinist

Frederick William I (German: Friedrich Wilhelm I.; 14 August 1688 – 31 May 1740), known as the Soldier King (German: Soldatenkönig), was King in Prussia and Elector of Brandenburg from 1713 until his death in 1740, as well as Prince of Neuchâtel.

Born in Berlin, he was raised by the Huguenot governess Marthe de Roucoulle. His political awakening occurred during the Great Northern War's plague outbreak in Prussia, leading to his challenge against corruption and inefficiency in government. He initiated reforms, especially in the military, doubling the Prussian Army, and increased the officer corps to 3,000. A believer in absolute monarchy, he focused on state development and financial reorganization, imposing taxes and stringent regulations on public servants. He made efforts to reduce crime, corruption and centralized his authority during his reign of 27 years, cementing Prussia as a regional power.

Despite his effective rule, he had a harsh nature, exacerbated by his health issues. He engaged in colonial affairs, but prioritized military expansion over colonial investments. His notable decisions included selling Prussian overseas colonies and the foundation of the Canton system, as well as the conquest of the port of Stettin.

His death in 1740 marked the end of a reign characterized by military and administrative reform. He was succeeded by his son, Frederick the Great.

== Early years ==
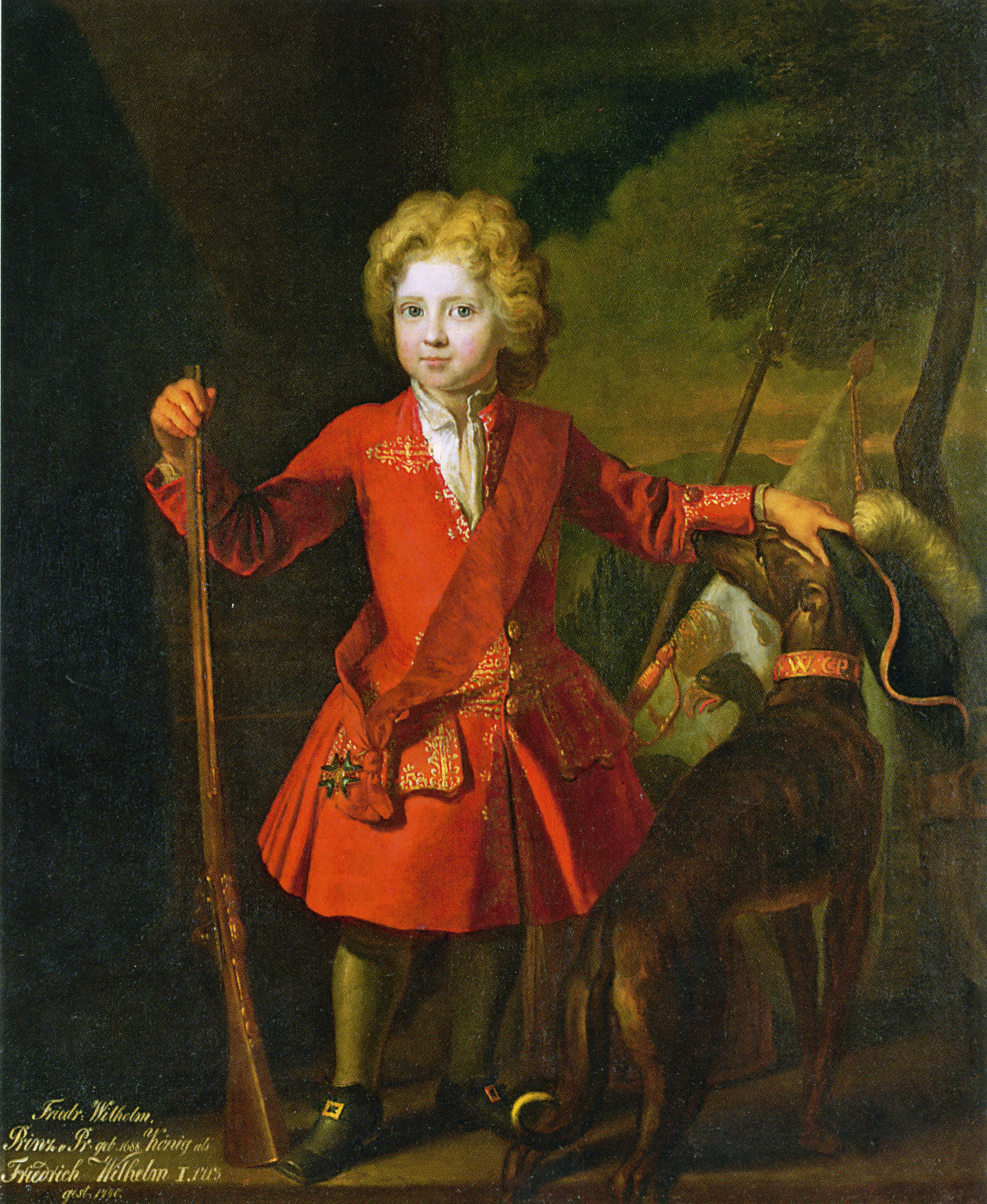
Portrait by Samuel Theodor Gericke, 1690s

Frederick William was born in Berlin to King Frederick I of Prussia and Princess Sophia Charlotte of Hanover. During his first years, he was raised by the Huguenot governess Marthe de Roucoulle. When the Great Northern War plague outbreak devastated Prussia, the inefficiency and corruption of the king's favorite ministers and senior officials were highlighted. Frederick William with a party that formed at the court brought down the leading minister Johann Kasimir Kolbe von Wartenberg and his cronies, following an official investigation that exposed Wartenberg's huge-scale misappropriation and embezzlement. His close associate August David zu Sayn-Wittgenstein-Hohenstein was imprisoned at Spandau Citadel, fined 70,000 thalers and banished subsequently. The incident exerted great influence on Frederick William, making him resent crime, corruption, wastage and inefficiency and realize the necessity of institutional reform. It also became the first time he actively participated in politics. From then on, Frederick I began to let his son take more power.

== Reign ==
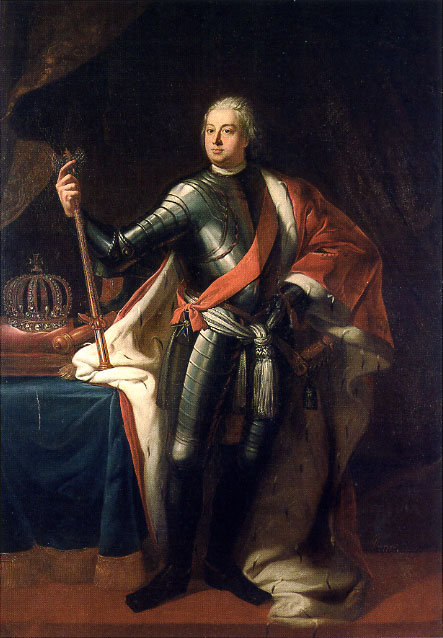
Portrait by Samuel Theodor Gericke, 1713

His father had successfully acquired the title of king for the Duchy of Prussia for which he had paid the high price of 2 million ducats to Emperor Leopold I, 600,000 ducats to the German clergy and 20,000 thalers to the Jesuit order. In addition, Frederick was obligated to provide Leopold with 8,000 soldiers for the War of the Spanish Succession. To demonstrate his new status, he had the Berlin Palace, Charlottenburg Palace, and Königsberg Castle doubled in size and furnished at considerable expense. However, in doing so, he had largely ruined the state's finances.

On ascending the throne in 1713, Frederick William therefore dismissed his father's corrupt "Cabinet of Three Counts". He worked persistently to reorganize the finances that had been shattered by his father, furthermore to enhance the economic development of his far-flung countries and to build up one of the largest and best equipped and trained armies in Europe. He would expand the Prussian Army from 38,000 men in 1713 to 80,000 in 1740, with an average of 1 out of every 25 Prussian men serving in the military.He expanded military obligations for the peasant class while replacing mandatory military service among the middle class with an annual tax, and he established schools and hospitals. The king encouraged commerce and farming, reclaimed marshes, stored grain in good times and sold it in bad times.

Frederick would also work to expand state income. He increased excise taxes, both on domestic and foreign goods, as well as subjecting the Prussian nobility to a land tax. He dictated the manual of Regulations for State Officials, containing 35 chapters and 297 paragraphs in which every public servant in Prussia could find his duties precisely set out: a minister or councillor failing to attend a committee meeting, for example, would lose six months' pay; if he absented himself a second time, he would be discharged from the royal service. In short, Frederick William I concerned himself with every aspect of his country, ruling an absolute monarchy with great energy and skill.

The king also took an interest in Prussian colonial affairs. In 1717, he revoked the charter of the Brandenburg Africa Company (BAC), which had been granted said charter by his father to establish a colony in West Africa known as the Brandenburg Gold Coast. The king was unwilling to spend money on maintaining either the colony or the Prussian Navy, preferring to utilise state revenues on enlarging the Royal Prussian Army. In 1717, Frederick William sold the Brandenburg Gold Coast to the Dutch West India Company.

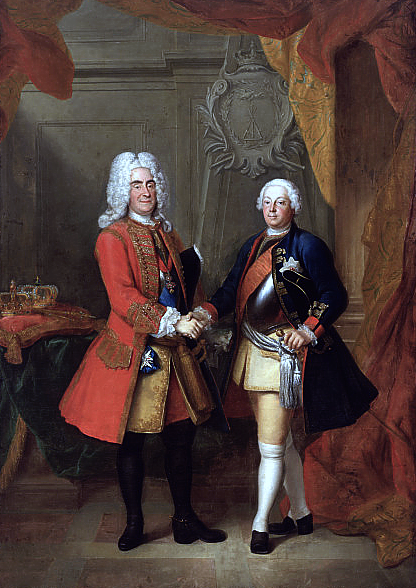
Portrait of Augustus II of Poland (left) and Frederick William I of Prussia, during Frederick William's 1728 visit to Dresden. Painting by Louis de Silvestre, c. 1730

In 1732, the king invited the Salzburg Protestants to settle in East Prussia, which had been depopulated by plague in 1709. Under the terms of the Peace of Augsburg, the prince-archbishop of Salzburg could require his subjects to practice the Catholic faith, but Protestants had the right to emigrate to a Protestant state. Prussian commissioners accompanied 20,000 Protestants to their new homes on the other side of Germany. Frederick William I personally welcomed the first group of migrants and sang Protestant hymns with them.

In 1733 he began building the Dutch Quarter in Potsdam, where he invited talented Dutch craftsmen to settle.

Frederick William intervened briefly in the Great Northern War, allied with Peter the Great of Russia, in order to gain a small portion of Swedish Pomerania; this gave Prussia new ports on the Baltic Sea coast. More significantly, aided by his close friend Leopold I, Prince of Anhalt-Dessau, the "Soldier-King" made considerable reforms to the Prussian army's training, tactics and conscription program—introducing the canton system, and greatly increasing the Prussian infantry's rate of fire through the introduction of the iron ramrod. Frederick William's reforms left his son Frederick with the most formidable army in Europe, which Frederick used to increase Prussia's power.

Although a highly effective ruler, Frederick William had a perpetually short temper which sometimes drove him to physically attack servants (or even his own children) with a cane at the slightest perceived provocation. His violent, harsh nature was further exacerbated by his inherited porphyritic disease, which gave him gout, obesity and frequent crippling stomach pains. He also had a notable contempt for France, and would sometimes fly into a rage at the mere mention of that country, although this did not stop him from encouraging the immigration of French Huguenot refugees to Prussia.

== Burial and reburials ==
Frederick William died in 1740 at age 51 and was interred at the Garrison Church in Potsdam. During World War II, in order to protect it from advancing allied forces, Hitler ordered the king's coffin, as well as those of Frederick the Great and Paul von Hindenburg, into hiding, first to Berlin and later to a salt mine outside of Bernterode. The coffins were later discovered by occupying American forces, who re-interred the bodies in St. Elizabeth's Church, Marburg in 1946. In 1953 the coffin was moved to Hohenzollern Castle, where it remained until 1991, when it was finally laid to rest on the steps of the altar in the Kaiser Friedrich Mausoleum in the Church of Peace on the palace grounds of Sanssouci. The original black marble sarcophagus collapsed at Burg Hohenzollern—the current one is a copper copy.

== Relationship with Frederick II ==
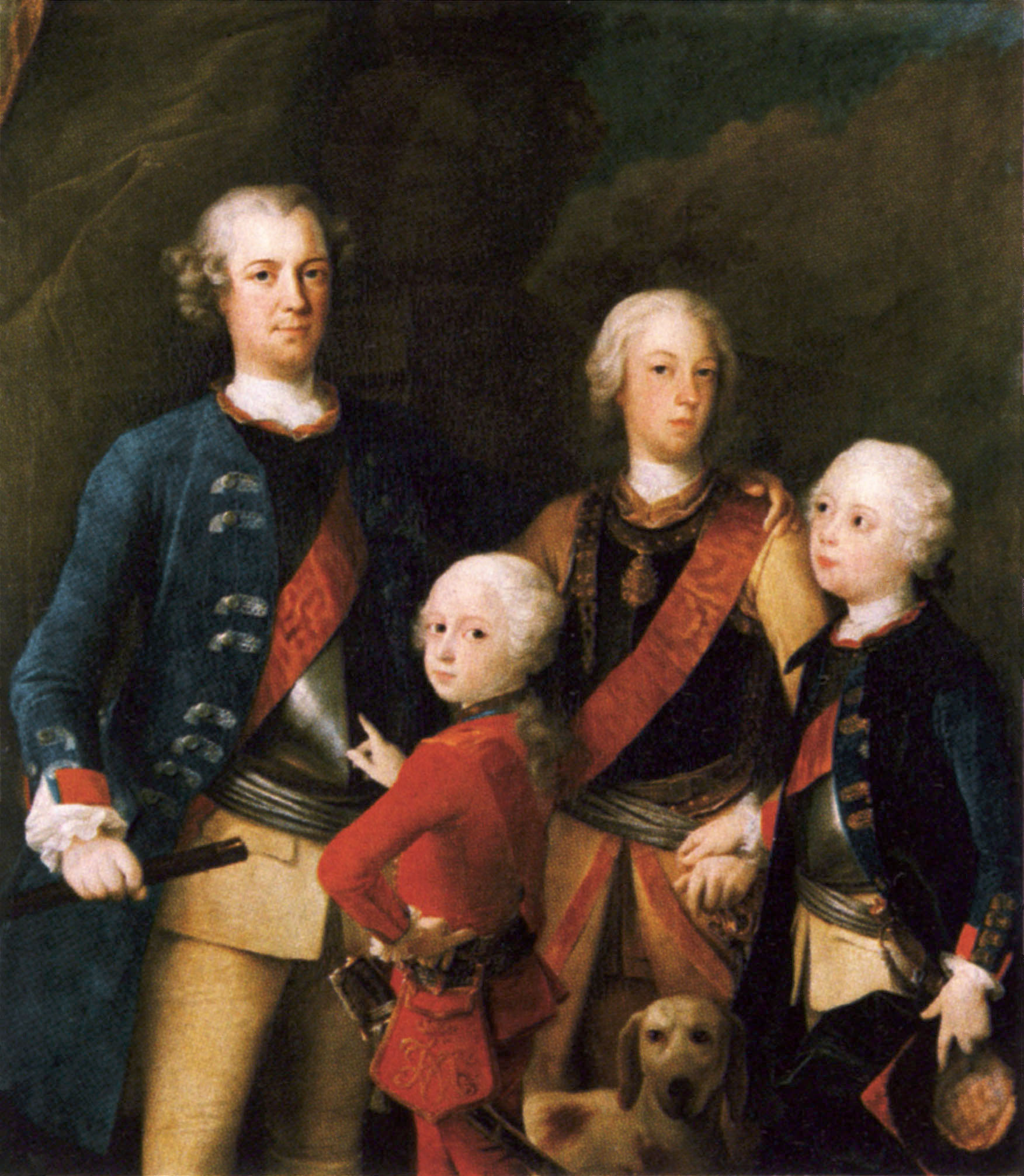
The sons of Frederick William I and Sophia Dorothea; left to right Frederick, Ferdinand, Augustus William and Henry. Painting by Francesco Carlo Rusca, 1737

His eldest surviving son was Frederick II (Fritz), born in 1712. Frederick William wanted him to become a fine soldier. As a small child, Fritz was awakened each morning by the firing of a cannon. At the age of 6, he was given his own regiment of children to drill as cadets, and a year later, he was given a miniature arsenal.

The love and affection Frederick William had for his heir initially was soon soured due to their increasingly different personalities. Frederick William ordered Fritz to undergo a minimal education, live a simple Protestant lifestyle, and focus on the Army and statesmanship as he had. However, the intellectual Fritz was more interested in music, books and French culture, which were forbidden by his father as decadent and unmanly. As Fritz's defiance for his father's rules increased, Frederick William would frequently beat or humiliate Fritz (he preferred his younger sibling Augustus William). Fritz was beaten for being thrown off a bolting horse and wearing gloves in cold weather.

At age 16, Frederick seems to have embarked upon a youthful affair with Peter Karl Christoph von Keith, a 17-year-old page of his father. Rumors of the liaison spread in the court, and the "intimacy" between the two boys provoked the comments of his sister, Wilhelmine, who wrote, "Though I had noticed that he was on more familiar terms with this page than was proper in his position, I did not know how intimate the friendship was." Rumors finally reached King Frederick William, who cultivated an ideal of ultramasculinity in his court, and derided his son's supposedly effeminate tendencies. As a result, Keith was dismissed from his service to the king and sent away to a regiment by the Dutch border, while Frederick was sent to the king's hunting lodge at Königs Wusterhausen in order to "repent of his sin".

After the prince attempted to flee to England with his tutor, Hans Hermann von Katte, the enraged king had Katte beheaded before the eyes of the prince, who was forced to watch the execution by soldiers on the King’s orders. Afterwards, he himself was court-martialled. The king may have thought that Frederick's relationship with Katte was also romantic, a suspicion that may have played a role in Katte receiving a death sentence. In any case, the court declared itself not competent in the case of the crown prince. Whether it was the king's intention to have his son executed as well (as Voltaire claims) is not clear. However, the Holy Roman Emperor Charles VI intervened, claiming that a prince could only be tried by the Imperial Diet of the Holy Roman Empire itself. Frederick was imprisoned in the Fortress of Küstrin from 2 September to 19 November 1731 and exiled from court until February 1732, during which time he was rigorously schooled in matters of state. After achieving a measure of reconciliation, Frederick William had his son married to Princess Elisabeth Christine of Brunswick-Wolfenbüttel-Bevern, whom Frederick had contempt for, but then grudgingly allowed him to indulge in his musical and literary interests again. He also gifted him a stud farm in East Prussia, and Rheinsberg Palace. By the time of Frederick William's death in 1740, he and Frederick were on at least civil terms with each other. However, his son Frederick did not mourn or grieve when his father died and made no public statements about it.

Although the relationship between Frederick William and Frederick was clearly hostile, Frederick wrote in his memoirs that his father "penetrated and understood great objectives and knew the best interests of his country better than any minister or general."

== Marriage and issue ==
Frederick William married his first cousin Sophia Dorothea of Hanover, George II's younger sister (daughter of his uncle, King George I of Great Britain and Sophia Dorothea of Celle) on 28 November 1706. Frederick William was faithful to his wife but they did not have a happy marriage: Sophia Dorothea feared his unpredictable and sometimes violent temper and resented him, both for allowing her no influence or independence at court, and for refusing to marry her children to their English cousins. She also abhorred his cruelty towards their son and heir Frederick (with whom she was close), although rather than trying to mend the relationship between father and son she quietly spurred Frederick on in his defiance. They had fourteen children, including:

Issue
Name	Portrait	Lifespan	Notes
Frederick Louis; Prince of Prussia		23 November 1707 – 13 May 1708	Died in infancy
Friedrike Wilhelmine; Margravine of Brandenburg-Bayreuth		3 July 1709 – 14 October 1758	Married Frederick, Margrave of Brandenburg-Bayreuth and had issue
Frederick William; Prince of Prussia		16 August 1710 – 21 July 1711	Died in infancy
Frederick II the Great; King of Prussia		24 January 1712 – 17 August 1786	King in Prussia (1740–1772); King of Prussia (1772–1786); married Elisabeth Christine of Brunswick-Wolfenbüttel-Bevern but had no issue
Charlotte Albertine; Princess of Prussia		5 May 1713 – 10 June 1714	Died in infancy
Frederica Louise; Margravine of Brandenburg-Ansbach		28 September 1714 – 4 February 1784	Married Charles William Frederick, Margrave of Brandenburg-Ansbach and had issue
Philippine Charlotte; Duchess of Brunswick-Wolfenbüttel		13 March 1716 – 17 February 1801	Married Charles I, Duke of Brunswick-Wolfenbüttel and had issue
Louis Charles William; Prince of Prussia		2 May 1717 – 31 August 1719	Died in early childhood
Sophia Dorothea; Margravine of Brandenburg-Schwedt; Princess in Prussia		25 January 1719 – 13 November 1765	Married Frederick William, Margrave of Brandenburg-Schwedt, Prince in Prussia and had issue
Louisa Ulrika; Queen of Sweden		24 July 1720 – 2 July 1782	Married Adolf Frederick, King of Sweden and had issue
Augustus William; Prince of Prussia		9 August 1722 – 12 June 1758	Married Duchess Luise of Brunswick-Wolfenbüttel and had issue (including Frederick William II)
Anna Amalia		9 November 1723 – 30 March 1787	Became Abbess of Quedlinburg 16 July 1755
Frederick Henry Louis; Prince of Prussia		18 January 1726 – 3 August 1802	Married Princess Wilhelmina of Hesse-Kassel but had no issue
Augustus Ferdinand; Prince of Prussia		23 May 1730 – 2 May 1813	Married Margravine Elisabeth Louise of Brandenburg-Schwedt and had issue

He was the godfather of the Prussian envoy Friedrich Wilhelm von Thulemeyer and of his grand-nephew, Prince Edward Augustus of Great Britain.

== Ancestry ==
Ancestors of Frederick William I of Prussia

8. George William, Elector of Brandenburg
4. Frederick William, Elector of Brandenburg
9. Elizabeth Charlotte of the Palatinate
2. Frederick I of Prussia
10. Frederick Henry, Prince of Orange
5. Louise Henriette of Orange-Nassau
11. Amalia of Solms-Braunfels
1. Frederick William I of Prussia
12. George, Duke of Brunswick-Lüneburg
6. Ernest Augustus, Elector of Hanover
13. Anne Eleonore of Hesse-Darmstadt
3. Sophia Charlotte of Hanover
14. Frederick V, Elector Palatine
7. Sophia of the Palatinate
15. Elizabeth Stuart

== Memorial site and exhibition ==
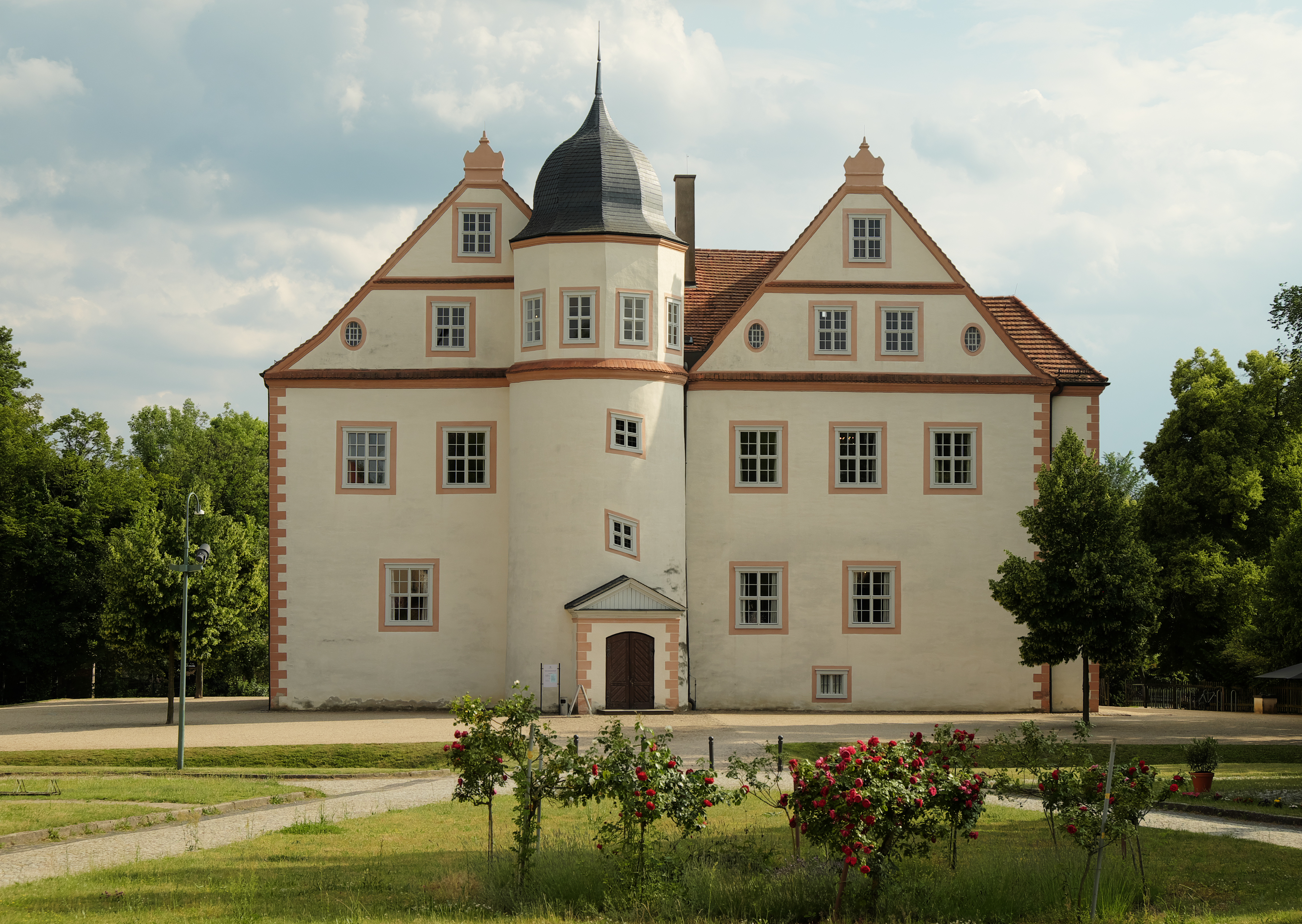
Königs Wusterhausen Castle

Königs Wusterhausen Castle, the king's hunting lodge and garden, were his favourite place to stay and to indulge in hunting when he wanted to relax from his state duties, which he performed at the Berlin Palace and the City Palace, Potsdam. His children also had to spend their holidays here regularly. Frederick the Great had a strong dislike for the place, but the two youngest sons, in old age, after Frederick's death, returned together a few times out of sentimental memories to where they spent so much time growing up.

Today the castle, southeast of the Berlin city limits not far from Berlin Airport, is a museum of the Prussian Palaces and Gardens Foundation Berlin-Brandenburg. Numerous valuable objects of baroque paintings and handicrafts are on display, mostly with connections to Frederick William and his family, many pieces of the original interior, as well as a large collection of portraits, mainly of officers, which the "Soldier King" painted himself.

== See also ==
- Prussian virtues

== Bibliography ==
- Taylor, Ronald (1997). Berlin and Its Culture: A Historical Portrait. New Haven, Conn: Yale University Press.
- Blanning, T. C. W. (2016). Frederick the Great: King of Prussia (First U.S. ed.). New York: Random House. ISBN 978-1-4000-6812-8.
- Carlyle, Thomas (1870). "Book IV. — Friedrich's Apprenticeship, First Stage - 1713-1728". History of Friedrich II of Prussia: Called Frederick the Great.
- Clark, Christopher (2006). Iron Kingdom: The Rise and Downfall of Prussia, 1600–1947. United Kingdom: Penguin Books.
- Schmidt, Werner (1996). Friedrich I. Kurfürst von Brandenburg, König in Preußen. Munich: Diederichs. ISBN 3-424-01319-6.
- Beloff, Max (2013). The Age of Absolutism: 1660–1815. Routledge Revivals, Taylor and Francis.
- Duffy, Christopher (1987). The Military Experience in the Age of Reason. London: Routledge.
- Shennan, Margaret (1995). The Rise of Brandenburg-Prussia. London: Routledge.
- Brahm, Felix; Rosenhaft, Eve (2016). Slavery Hinterland: Transatlantic Slavery and Continental Europe, 1680–1850. Boydell & Brewer. ISBN 978-1-78327-112-2.
- Walker, Mack (1992). The Salzburg Transaction: Expulsion and Redemption in Eighteenth-Century Germany. Ithaca, New York: Cornell University Press. ISBN 0-8014-2777-0.
- Koch, H.W. (1978). A History of Prussia. Dorset Press. ISBN 0-88029-158-3.
- Mitford, Nancy (1970). Frederick the Great. New York: Harper & Row.
- MacDonogh, Giles (2007). After the Reich: The Brutal History of the Allied Occupation. New York: Basic Books.
- of Prussia, Margravine of Brandenburg-Bayreuth, Wilhelmine (1888). Memoirs of Wilhelmine, Margravine of Baireuth. Translated by Princess Christian of Schleswig-Holstein. New York: Harper & Brothers.
- Goldsmith, Margaret (1929). Frederick the Great. C. Boni.
- Farquhar, Michael (2001). A Treasure of Royal Scandals. New York: Penguin Books. ISBN 0-7394-2025-9.
- Genealogie ascendante jusqu'au quatrieme degre inclusivement de tous les Rois et Princes de maisons souveraines de l'Europe actuellement vivans [Genealogy up to the fourth degree inclusive of all the Kings and Princes of sovereign houses of Europe currently living] (in French). Bourdeaux: Frederic Guillaume Birnstiel. 1768.
- Mitford, Nancy (1984). Frederick the Great. E.P. Dutton. ISBN 978-0-525-48147-8.

Frederick William I of Prussia House of Hohenzollern Born: 14 August 1688 Died: 31 March 1740
Regnal titles
Preceded by Frederick I	King in Prussia; Elector of Brandenburg; Prince of Neuchâtel; 1713–1740	Succeeded by Frederick II
