= Jochen Klepper =

German Christian writer, poet and journalist (1903–1942)

Joachim Georg Wilhelm Klepper (22 March 1903 – 11 December 1942) was a German Christian writer, poet and journalist.

== Life ==
Klepper was born in Beuthen an der Oder, (now Bytom Odrzański in Poland) on 22 March 1903. He was the third child born to his mother Hedwig Klepper née Weidlich and his father, a Protestant pastor by the name of Georg Klepper. Klepper was the first born son to the couple and had four siblings. His older sisters were named Margot and Hildegard. His two younger brothers were named Erhard and Wilhelm.

Suffering from severe asthma, he was schooled at home by his father, a Lutheran minister, until the age of 14. He then studied at the Gymnasium in Glogau. In 1922, he started studying theology at the University of Erlangen, before transferring to the University of Breslau a year later. He completed his degree and began doctoral studies, but in 1926 he abandoned this, instead working as a church publisher and later a journalist to support his family. He held a sermon as a substitute to his ill father in 1927.

In 1931, Klepper married the widow Johanna (Hanni) Stein, née Gerstel. They moved to Berlin where he worked for the radio but was dismissed in 1933.

Starting in December 1935, he wrote for Karl Ludwig Freiherr von und zu Guttenbergs journal Weiße Blätter (White Papers).

In December 1940, Klepper was drafted by the German Army — perhaps a bureaucratic mistake since citizens married to Jews were not to be drafted. His wife however had been baptised just prior to their church wedding in 1938. While Klepper did not see combat, he served in a supply unit for forces through Bulgaria, Poland and Soviet Union before being discharged in 1942 to tend to his wife.

Klepper's wife, Johanna, had two daughters from her previous mariage. The girls were called Brigitte and Renate. Brigitte, the older daughter, was sent to England. Renate was too young to emigrate and stayed behind.

On 11 December 1942, after Adolf Eichmann refused visa for the couple's second daughter, the three of them committed suicide by turning on a gas valve. Jochen wrote in his journal just before they died: "Tonight we die together. Over us stands in the last moments the image of the blessed Christ who surrounds us. With this view we end our lives." After their death, his sister Hildegard gave the diary to the Allied trial against Adolf Eichmann where it was used as evidence against him (Session 51).

== Diary ==
The book In the Shadow of Your Wings, appeared in 1956, contains a selection from the diaries of Klepper.

Klepper wrote many hymns that became part of modern Protestant and Catholic hymnals, such as "Gott wohnt in einem Lichte" and the Advent hymn "Die Nacht ist vorgedrungen".
