= Church of Reconciliation, Dresden =

Lutheran church in Dresden, Germany

Coordinates: 51°02′35″N 13°48′00″E

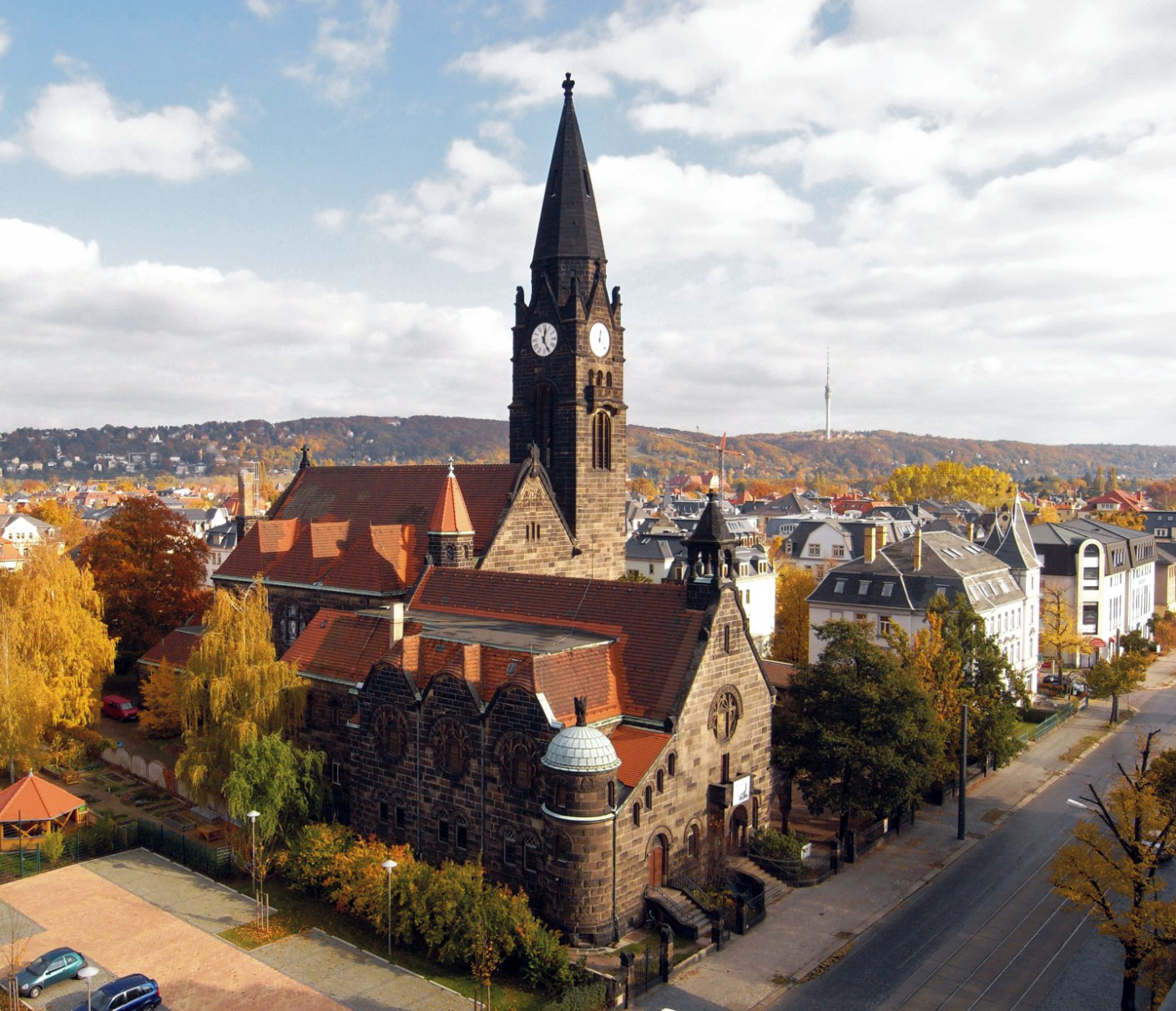
View of the Church of Reconciliation. In the foreground is the church hall.

The Reconciliation Church (German: Versöhnungskirche) is a Lutheran church on the Schandauerstraße / Wittenberger Straße 96 in Striesen, Dresden, Germany.

== Sources ==
- Ulrich Hübner et al.: Symbol und Wahrhaftigkeit. Reformbaukunst in Dresden. Verlag der Kunst Dresden Ingwert Paulsen jun., Husum 2005, ISBN 3-86530-068-5
- Gilbert Lupfer, Bernhard Sterra, Martin Wörner (eds.): Architekturführer Dresden. Dietrich Reimer Verlag, Berlin 1997, ISBN 3-496-01179-3
